This is a partial list of unnumbered minor planets for principal provisional designations assigned between 1 January and 31 December 1995. , a total of 474 bodies remain unnumbered for this period. Also see previous and next year.

B 

|- id="1995 BK2" bgcolor=#FFC2E0
| 7 ||  || AMO || 22.6 || data-sort-value="0.11" | 110 m || single || 7 days || 07 Feb 1995 || 32 || align=left | Disc.: Spacewatch || 
|- id="1995 BX3" bgcolor=#d6d6d6
| 0 ||  || MBA-O || 17.4 || 1.8 km || multiple || 1995–2021 || 18 Jan 2021 || 42 || align=left | Disc.: Kitt PeakAlt.: 1995 BF17 || 
|- id="1995 BC10" bgcolor=#fefefe
| 0 ||  || MBA-I || 18.42 || data-sort-value="0.62" | 620 m || multiple || 1995–2022 || 27 Jan 2022 || 84 || align=left | Disc.: Spacewatch || 
|- id="1995 BY10" bgcolor=#d6d6d6
| 0 ||  = (619151) || MBA-O || 16.9 || 2.3 km || multiple || 1995–2022 || 19 Oct 2022 || 85 || align=left | Disc.: SpacewatchAlt.: 2013 YZ167 || 
|- id="1995 BH13" bgcolor=#fefefe
| 0 ||  || MBA-I || 17.6 || data-sort-value="0.90" | 900 m || multiple || 1995–2021 || 18 Jan 2021 || 53 || align=left | Disc.: Spacewatch || 
|- id="1995 BE15" bgcolor=#E9E9E9
| 0 ||  || MBA-M || 17.2 || 2.0 km || multiple || 1995–2021 || 05 Jan 2021 || 96 || align=left | Disc.: Spacewatch || 
|- id="1995 BF15" bgcolor=#E9E9E9
| 0 ||  || MBA-M || 17.83 || data-sort-value="0.81" | 810 m || multiple || 1995–2021 || 08 Sep 2021 || 86 || align=left | Disc.: Spacewatch || 
|}
back to top

C 

|- id="1995 CR" bgcolor=#FFC2E0
| 3 || 1995 CR || ATE || 21.8 || data-sort-value="0.16" | 160 m || multiple || 2014–2020 || 28 Feb 2020 || 100 || align=left | Disc.: SpacewatchPotentially hazardous objectAlt.: 2014 CL13 || 
|- id="1995 CS" bgcolor=#FFC2E0
| 8 || 1995 CS || APO || 25.5 || data-sort-value="0.028" | 28 m || single || 3 days || 07 Feb 1995 || 11 || align=left | Disc.: Spacewatch || 
|- id="1995 CR2" bgcolor=#fefefe
| 0 ||  || MBA-I || 18.88 || data-sort-value="0.50" | 500 m || multiple || 1995–2021 || 26 Nov 2021 || 55 || align=left | Disc.: Spacewatch || 
|- id="1995 CB3" bgcolor=#fefefe
| 1 ||  || MBA-I || 18.4 || data-sort-value="0.62" | 620 m || multiple || 1995–2021 || 13 Jan 2021 || 30 || align=left | Disc.: SpacewatchAdded on 11 May 2021 || 
|- id="1995 CA5" bgcolor=#E9E9E9
| 0 ||  || MBA-M || 17.08 || 2.1 km || multiple || 1986–2022 || 27 Jan 2022 || 140 || align=left | Disc.: Palomar Obs.Alt.: 1986 FC, 2012 YD2 || 
|- id="1995 CH8" bgcolor=#fefefe
| 0 ||  || MBA-I || 18.4 || data-sort-value="0.62" | 620 m || multiple || 1995–2021 || 11 Jun 2021 || 54 || align=left | Disc.: Spacewatch || 
|- id="1995 CB9" bgcolor=#E9E9E9
| 0 ||  || MBA-M || 17.18 || 2.0 km || multiple || 1995–2021 || 30 Nov 2021 || 127 || align=left | Disc.: Spacewatch || 
|- id="1995 CE11" bgcolor=#fefefe
| 0 ||  || MBA-I || 17.9 || data-sort-value="0.78" | 780 m || multiple || 1995–2020 || 20 Oct 2020 || 120 || align=left | Disc.: Spacewatch || 
|}
back to top

D 

|- id="1995 DV1" bgcolor=#FFC2E0
| 8 ||  || AMO || 23.0 || data-sort-value="0.089" | 89 m || single || 8 days || 05 Mar 1995 || 13 || align=left | Disc.: Spacewatch || 
|- id="1995 DB2" bgcolor=#C2E0FF
| 2 ||  || TNO || 7.6 || 100 km || multiple || 1995–2020 || 18 Feb 2020 || 40 || align=left | Disc.: Mauna Kea Obs.LoUTNOs, cubewano (cold) || 
|- id="1995 DX3" bgcolor=#E9E9E9
| 0 ||  || MBA-M || 17.6 || 1.3 km || multiple || 1995–2021 || 16 Jan 2021 || 70 || align=left | Disc.: SpacewatchAdded on 22 July 2020 || 
|- id="1995 DW7" bgcolor=#d6d6d6
| 0 ||  || MBA-O || 16.66 || 2.6 km || multiple || 1995–2021 || 15 Apr 2021 || 84 || align=left | Disc.: SpacewatchAdded on 22 July 2020 || 
|}
back to top

E 

|- id="1995 EV9" bgcolor=#d6d6d6
| 0 ||  || MBA-O || 16.8 || 2.4 km || multiple || 1995–2020 || 22 Apr 2020 || 101 || align=left | Disc.: Spacewatch || 
|}
back to top

F 

|- id="1995 FF" bgcolor=#FFC2E0
| 7 || 1995 FF || APO || 26.5 || data-sort-value="0.018" | 18 m || single || 5 days || 02 Apr 1995 || 16 || align=left | Disc.: Spacewatch || 
|- id="1995 FG" bgcolor=#FFC2E0
| 5 || 1995 FG || AMO || 23.0 || data-sort-value="0.089" | 89 m || single || 56 days || 22 May 1995 || 21 || align=left | Disc.: Spacewatch || 
|- id="1995 FO" bgcolor=#FFC2E0
| 2 || 1995 FO || APO || 20.8 || data-sort-value="0.25" | 250 m || multiple || 1995–2015 || 24 Apr 2015 || 57 || align=left | Disc.: Spacewatch || 
|- id="1995 FX" bgcolor=#FFC2E0
| 1 || 1995 FX || AMO || 20.1 || data-sort-value="0.34" | 340 m || multiple || 1995–2012 || 29 Feb 2012 || 204 || align=left | Disc.: CERGA Obs. || 
|- id="1995 FX2" bgcolor=#E9E9E9
| 0 ||  || MBA-M || 16.92 || 2.3 km || multiple || 1995–2021 || 27 Nov 2021 || 163 || align=left | Disc.: Spacewatch || 
|- id="1995 FT10" bgcolor=#fefefe
| 1 ||  || MBA-I || 19.0 || data-sort-value="0.47" | 470 m || multiple || 1995–2019 || 04 Apr 2019 || 42 || align=left | Disc.: SpacewatchAlt.: 2009 KK27 || 
|- id="1995 FB21" bgcolor=#C2E0FF
| E ||  || TNO || 7.5 || 109 km || single || 9 days || 07 Apr 1995 ||  || align=left | Disc.: Siding SpringLoUTNOs, cubewano? || 
|- id="1995 FR21" bgcolor=#fefefe
| 0 ||  || MBA-I || 18.11 || data-sort-value="0.71" | 710 m || multiple || 1995–2022 || 25 Jan 2022 || 171 || align=left | Disc.: Spacewatch || 
|}
back to top

G 

|- id="1995 GJ" bgcolor=#C2E0FF
| E || 1995 GJ || TNO || 7.0 || 166 km || single || 1 day || 04 Apr 1995 || 6 || align=left | Disc.: Mauna Kea Obs.LoUTNOs, other TNO || 
|- id="1995 GV1" bgcolor=#d6d6d6
| 0 ||  || MBA-O || 16.3 || 3.1 km || multiple || 1995–2020 || 08 Dec 2020 || 129 || align=left | Disc.: SpacewatchAlt.: 2018 HW2 || 
|- id="1995 GB3" bgcolor=#E9E9E9
| 0 ||  = (619152) || MBA-M || 17.7 || 1.2 km || multiple || 1995–2022 || 28 Sep 2022 || 60 || align=left | Disc.: Spacewatch || 
|- id="1995 GZ3" bgcolor=#E9E9E9
| 0 ||  || MBA-M || 17.83 || data-sort-value="0.81" | 810 m || multiple || 1995–2021 || 03 Sep 2021 || 25 || align=left | Disc.: SpacewatchAdded on 13 September 2020 || 
|- id="1995 GA7" bgcolor=#C2E0FF
| E ||  || TNO || 7.5 || 150 km || single || 2 days || 05 Apr 1995 || 7 || align=left | Disc.: Mauna Kea Obs.LoUTNOs, plutino? || 
|- id="1995 GY7" bgcolor=#C2E0FF
| E ||  || TNO || 7.5 || 109 km || single || 1 day || 07 Apr 1995 || 7 || align=left | Disc.: La Silla Obs.LoUTNOs, cubewano? || 
|- id="1995 GD10" bgcolor=#d6d6d6
| 0 ||  || MBA-O || 15.72 || 4.0 km || multiple || 1995–2021 || 09 Dec 2021 || 304 || align=left | Disc.: Catalina Station || 
|}
back to top

H 

|- id="1995 HM" bgcolor=#FFC2E0
| 4 || 1995 HM || AMO || 23.0 || data-sort-value="0.089" | 89 m || single || 55 days || 20 Jun 1995 || 57 || align=left | Disc.: Spacewatch || 
|}
back to top

K 

|- id="1995 KB" bgcolor=#E9E9E9
| 0 || 1995 KB || MBA-M || 17.80 || 1.2 km || multiple || 1995–2021 || 12 Sep 2021 || 123 || align=left | Disc.: AMOSAlt.: 2016 GQ192 || 
|- id="1995 KE1" bgcolor=#E9E9E9
| 2 ||  || MBA-M || 18.3 || data-sort-value="0.65" | 650 m || multiple || 1995–2020 || 23 Jun 2020 || 42 || align=left | Disc.: SpacewatchAlt.: 2020 JV17 || 
|- id="1995 KG1" bgcolor=#FA8072
| 3 ||  || MCA || 19.8 || data-sort-value="0.61" | 610 m || multiple || 1995–2010 || 15 Jul 2010 || 58 || align=left | Disc.: Spacewatch || 
|- id="1995 KJ1" bgcolor=#C2E0FF
| E ||  || TNO || 6.5 || 172 km || single || 26 days || 25 Jun 1995 || 7 || align=left | Disc.: Mauna Kea Obs.LoUTNOs, cubewano? || 
|- id="1995 KK1" bgcolor=#C2E0FF
| E ||  || TNO || 8.5 || 94 km || single || 1 day || 31 May 1995 || 5 || align=left | Disc.: Mauna Kea Obs.LoUTNOs, plutino? || 
|}
back to top

L 

|- id="1995 LA" bgcolor=#FFC2E0
| 6 || 1995 LA || APO || 24.0 || data-sort-value="0.056" | 56 m || single || 7 days || 08 Jun 1995 || 49 || align=left | Disc.: SpacewatchAMO at MPC || 
|}
back to top

M 

|- id="1995 MJ5" bgcolor=#d6d6d6
| 0 ||  || MBA-O || 16.79 || 2.4 km || multiple || 1995–2021 || 02 Dec 2021 || 188 || align=left | Disc.: SpacewatchAlt.: 2015 MO14 || 
|- id="1995 MC6" bgcolor=#E9E9E9
| 2 ||  || MBA-M || 17.6 || data-sort-value="0.90" | 900 m || multiple || 1995–2020 || 07 Dec 2020 || 52 || align=left | Disc.: Spacewatch || 
|- id="1995 MB7" bgcolor=#fefefe
| 0 ||  || MBA-I || 18.47 || data-sort-value="0.60" | 600 m || multiple || 1992–2021 || 03 Aug 2021 || 230 || align=left | Disc.: Spacewatch || 
|- id="1995 MR7" bgcolor=#fefefe
| 0 ||  || MBA-I || 18.70 || data-sort-value="0.54" | 540 m || multiple || 1995–2020 || 11 May 2020 || 56 || align=left | Disc.: Spacewatch || 
|- id="1995 MC8" bgcolor=#E9E9E9
| 0 ||  || MBA-M || 17.7 || 1.6 km || multiple || 1995–2021 || 07 Jan 2021 || 51 || align=left | Disc.: Spacewatch || 
|- id="1995 MR8" bgcolor=#E9E9E9
| 0 ||  || MBA-M || 17.8 || 1.5 km || multiple || 1995–2018 || 06 Oct 2018 || 61 || align=left | Disc.: SpacewatchAdded on 13 September 2020 || 
|- id="1995 MS8" bgcolor=#fefefe
| 3 ||  || MBA-I || 18.9 || data-sort-value="0.49" | 490 m || multiple || 1995–2020 || 05 Nov 2020 || 27 || align=left | Disc.: Spacewatch Added on 17 January 2021 || 
|}
back to top

N 

|- id="1995 NA" bgcolor=#FFC2E0
| 8 || 1995 NA || AMO || 23.2 || data-sort-value="0.081" | 81 m || single || 1 day || 06 Jul 1995 || 8 || align=left | Disc.: Spacewatch || 
|}
back to top

O 

|- id="1995 OB9" bgcolor=#E9E9E9
| 0 ||  || MBA-M || 17.69 || data-sort-value="0.86" | 860 m || multiple || 1995–2022 || 24 Jan 2022 || 62 || align=left | Disc.: SpacewatchAdded on 17 January 2021 || 
|- id="1995 OY10" bgcolor=#fefefe
| 0 ||  || MBA-I || 18.9 || data-sort-value="0.49" | 490 m || multiple || 1995–2020 || 21 Sep 2020 || 69 || align=left | Disc.: SpacewatchAlt.: 2013 SQ17 || 
|- id="1995 OA11" bgcolor=#fefefe
| 0 ||  || MBA-I || 18.8 || data-sort-value="0.52" | 520 m || multiple || 1995–2020 || 09 Dec 2020 || 39 || align=left | Disc.: SpacewatchAdded on 22 July 2020 || 
|- id="1995 OC13" bgcolor=#fefefe
| 0 ||  || MBA-I || 18.2 || data-sort-value="0.68" | 680 m || multiple || 1995–2020 || 21 Jun 2020 || 99 || align=left | Disc.: SpacewatchAlt.: 2017 OL67 || 
|- id="1995 OT14" bgcolor=#E9E9E9
| 1 ||  || MBA-M || 17.5 || data-sort-value="0.94" | 940 m || multiple || 1995–2021 || 15 Jan 2021 || 192 || align=left | Disc.: Spacewatch || 
|- id="1995 OW15" bgcolor=#E9E9E9
| 0 ||  || MBA-M || 17.51 || 1.8 km || multiple || 1995–2021 || 14 May 2021 || 95 || align=left | Disc.: SpacewatchAlt.: 2008 NG1, 2009 UL49 || 
|- id="1995 OD16" bgcolor=#E9E9E9
| 1 ||  || MBA-M || 18.3 || data-sort-value="0.65" | 650 m || multiple || 1991–2021 || 15 Jan 2021 || 76 || align=left | Disc.: SpacewatchAdded on 17 January 2021 || 
|- id="1995 OF16" bgcolor=#fefefe
| 3 ||  || MBA-I || 18.6 || data-sort-value="0.57" | 570 m || multiple || 1995–2016 || 19 Oct 2016 || 35 || align=left | Disc.: Spacewatch || 
|- id="1995 OE17" bgcolor=#d6d6d6
| 1 ||  || MBA-O || 16.7 || 2.5 km || multiple || 1995–2019 || 02 Jan 2019 || 24 || align=left | Disc.: Spacewatch || 
|- id="1995 OQ17" bgcolor=#E9E9E9
| 0 ||  || MBA-M || 17.67 || data-sort-value="0.87" | 870 m || multiple || 1995–2022 || 25 Jan 2022 || 57 || align=left | Disc.: SpacewatchAdded on 17 January 2021Alt.: 2010 CR95 || 
|- id="1995 OU18" bgcolor=#d6d6d6
| 0 ||  || MBA-O || 16.2 || 3.2 km || multiple || 1995–2020 || 28 Apr 2020 || 108 || align=left | Disc.: Spacewatch || 
|- id="1995 OV18" bgcolor=#E9E9E9
| 0 ||  || MBA-M || 17.30 || 1.5 km || multiple || 1995–2021 || 17 Apr 2021 || 96 || align=left | Disc.: Spacewatch || 
|- id="1995 OW18" bgcolor=#FA8072
| 0 ||  || MCA || 19.83 || data-sort-value="0.25" | 310 m || multiple || 1995-2022 || 10 Jun 2022 || 52 || align=left | Disc.: SpacewatchAdded on 19 October 2020 || 
|- id="1995 OX18" bgcolor=#d6d6d6
| 2 ||  || MBA-O || 17.0 || 2.2 km || multiple || 1995–2020 || 23 Oct 2020 || 45 || align=left | Disc.: Spacewatch Added on 17 January 2021Alt.: 2010 LK11 || 
|}
back to top

Q 

|- id="1995 QK3" bgcolor=#FA8072
| 4 ||  || MCA || 19.75 || data-sort-value="0.33" | 330 m || multiple || 1995-2022 || 22 Mar 2022 || 30 || align=left | Disc.: Spacewatch Alt.: 2022 DK3 || 
|- id="1995 QH5" bgcolor=#fefefe
| 0 ||  || MBA-I || 18.5 || data-sort-value="0.59" | 590 m || multiple || 1995–2020 || 20 Oct 2020 || 72 || align=left | Disc.: SpacewatchAdded on 19 October 2020 || 
|- id="1995 QO5" bgcolor=#E9E9E9
| 0 ||  || MBA-M || 17.41 || 1.4 km || multiple || 1995–2021 || 29 Jul 2021 || 112 || align=left | Disc.: SpacewatchAlt.: 2017 QZ30 || 
|- id="1995 QV5" bgcolor=#E9E9E9
| 0 ||  || MBA-M || 17.5 || data-sort-value="0.82" | 1.3 km || multiple || 1995-2022 || 28 Jan 2022 || 44 || align=left | Disc.: Spacewatch Alt.: 2022 AQ10 || 
|- id="1995 QJ6" bgcolor=#d6d6d6
| 0 ||  || MBA-O || 16.66 || 2.6 km || multiple || 1995–2022 || 09 May 2022 || 71 || align=left | Disc.: Spacewatch || 
|- id="1995 QR6" bgcolor=#E9E9E9
| 0 ||  || MBA-M || 16.58 || 2.7 km || multiple || 1995–2021 || 09 May 2021 || 131 || align=left | Disc.: SpacewatchAdded on 17 January 2021Alt.: 2016 CL73 || 
|- id="1995 QK7" bgcolor=#E9E9E9
| 0 ||  || MBA-M || 17.48 || 1.3 km || multiple || 1995–2021 || 02 Dec 2021 || 120 || align=left | Disc.: Spacewatch || 
|- id="1995 QL9" bgcolor=#d6d6d6
| 0 ||  || MBA-O || 17.1 || 2.1 km || multiple || 1995–2020 || 20 Oct 2020 || 47 || align=left | Disc.: SpacewatchAdded on 19 October 2020 || 
|- id="1995 QG12" bgcolor=#C2FFFF
| 0 ||  || JT || 13.82 || 9.6 km || multiple || 1995–2021 || 28 Nov 2021 || 122 || align=left | Disc.: SpacewatchGreek camp (L4) || 
|- id="1995 QL12" bgcolor=#E9E9E9
| 0 ||  || MBA-M || 17.68 || data-sort-value="0.87" | 870 m || multiple || 1995–2021 || 17 Jan 2021 || 65 || align=left | Disc.: SpacewatchAdded on 21 August 2021Alt.: 2013 AF60, 2014 HF78 || 
|- id="1995 QP12" bgcolor=#d6d6d6
| 0 ||  || MBA-O || 17.0 || 2.2 km || multiple || 1995–2021 || 12 May 2021 || 42 || align=left | Disc.: SpacewatchAdded on 5 November 2021 || 
|- id="1995 QS12" bgcolor=#E9E9E9
| 0 ||  || MBA-M || 18.18 || data-sort-value="0.97" | 970 m || multiple || 1995–2021 || 09 Dec 2021 || 65 || align=left | Disc.: SpacewatchAdded on 22 July 2020Alt.: 2008 TD134 || 
|- id="1995 QA14" bgcolor=#E9E9E9
| 0 ||  || MBA-M || 17.6 || 1.7 km || multiple || 1995–2018 || 12 Aug 2018 || 34 || align=left | Disc.: Spacewatch || 
|- id="1995 QF14" bgcolor=#d6d6d6
| 0 ||  || MBA-O || 17.3 || 1.9 km || multiple || 1995–2020 || 12 Dec 2020 || 80 || align=left | Disc.: Spacewatch || 
|- id="1995 QU15" bgcolor=#E9E9E9
| 0 ||  || MBA-M || 18.14 || data-sort-value="0.70" | 700 m || multiple || 1995–2020 || 16 Oct 2020 || 74 || align=left | Disc.: Spacewatch || 
|- id="1995 QV15" bgcolor=#E9E9E9
| 1 ||  || MBA-M || 18.0 || 1.4 km || multiple || 1995–2018 || 12 Aug 2018 || 36 || align=left | Disc.: Spacewatch || 
|- id="1995 QY15" bgcolor=#d6d6d6
| 0 ||  || MBA-O || 17.10 || 2.1 km || multiple || 1995–2021 || 07 Nov 2021 || 93 || align=left | Disc.: SpacewatchAdded on 22 July 2020 || 
|- id="1995 QB16" bgcolor=#E9E9E9
| 0 ||  || MBA-M || 18.2 || 1.3 km || multiple || 1995–2016 || 29 Mar 2016 || 32 || align=left | Disc.: SpacewatchAdded on 21 August 2021 || 
|- id="1995 QE17" bgcolor=#E9E9E9
| 0 ||  || MBA-M || 17.7 || 1.2 km || multiple || 1995–2020 || 19 Apr 2020 || 71 || align=left | Disc.: Spacewatch || 
|- id="1995 QG17" bgcolor=#fefefe
| 0 ||  || MBA-I || 18.0 || data-sort-value="0.75" | 750 m || multiple || 1995–2019 || 06 Sep 2019 || 70 || align=left | Disc.: Spacewatch || 
|- id="1995 QJ17" bgcolor=#E9E9E9
| 0 ||  || MBA-M || 16.94 || 1.7 km || multiple || 1995–2021 || 25 Oct 2021 || 119 || align=left | Disc.: Spacewatch || 
|- id="1995 QK17" bgcolor=#E9E9E9
| 1 ||  || MBA-M || 18.1 || 1.3 km || multiple || 1995–2019 || 02 Jan 2019 || 42 || align=left | Disc.: DB MissingAdded on 22 July 2020 || 
|}
back to top

R 

|- id="1995 RT" bgcolor=#d6d6d6
| 0 || 1995 RT || MBA-O || 17.34 || 1.9 km || multiple || 1995–2021 || 18 May 2021 || 62 || align=left | Disc.: AMOS || 
|- id="1995 RB1" bgcolor=#E9E9E9
| 0 ||  = (619153) || MBA-M || 17.2 || 1.5 km || multiple || 1991–2022 || 21 Oct 2022 || 87 || align=left | Disc.: SpacewatchAdded on 22 July 2020 || 
|- id="1995 RE1" bgcolor=#d6d6d6
| 0 ||  || MBA-O || 17.86 || 1.5 km || multiple || 1995–2022 || 29 Sep 2022 || 55 || align=left | Disc.: SpacewatchAdded on 29 January 2022 || 
|}
back to top

S 

|- id="1995 SB" bgcolor=#FFC2E0
| 4 || 1995 SB || AMO || 22.3 || data-sort-value="0.12" | 120 m || multiple || 1995–2016 || 10 Mar 2016 || 34 || align=left | Disc.: Spacewatch || 
|- id="1995 SC1" bgcolor=#FFC2E0
| 6 ||  || AMO || 22.7 || data-sort-value="0.10" | 100 m || single || 23 days || 16 Oct 1995 || 15 || align=left | Disc.: Spacewatch || 
|- id="1995 SD1" bgcolor=#FFC2E0
| 0 ||  || AMO || 20.6 || data-sort-value="0.27" | 270 m || multiple || 1995–2009 || 17 Oct 2009 || 60 || align=left | Disc.: Spacewatch || 
|- id="1995 ST1" bgcolor=#d6d6d6
| 0 ||  || MBA-O || 15.87 || 3.7 km || multiple || 1995–2021 || 09 Jul 2021 || 95 || align=left | Disc.: AMOSAlt.: 2010 DR99 || 
|- id="1995 SA4" bgcolor=#FFC2E0
| 5 ||  || AMO || 22.3 || data-sort-value="0.12" | 120 m || single || 33 days || 30 Oct 1995 || 30 || align=left | Disc.: Spacewatch || 
|- id="1995 SU6" bgcolor=#E9E9E9
| 0 ||  || MBA-M || 16.99 || 2.2 km || multiple || 1995–2021 || 01 May 2021 || 89 || align=left | Disc.: SpacewatchAlt.: 2016 CH86 || 
|- id="1995 SB7" bgcolor=#E9E9E9
| 0 ||  || MBA-M || 18.44 || data-sort-value="0.86" | 860 m || multiple || 1995–2021 || 27 Nov 2021 || 59 || align=left | Disc.: SpacewatchAlt.: 2008 SU71 || 
|- id="1995 SE7" bgcolor=#d6d6d6
| 0 ||  || MBA-O || 17.0 || 2.3 km || multiple || 1995-2017 || 15 Aug 2017 || 35 || align=left | Disc.: Spacewatch Alt.: 2017 MQ27 || 
|- id="1995 SL7" bgcolor=#E9E9E9
| 0 ||  || MBA-M || 17.82 || 1.1 km || multiple || 1995–2021 || 28 Sep 2021 || 122 || align=left | Disc.: Spacewatch || 
|- id="1995 SF8" bgcolor=#fefefe
| 0 ||  || MBA-I || 18.7 || data-sort-value="0.54" | 540 m || multiple || 1995–2020 || 16 Oct 2020 || 60 || align=left | Disc.: Spacewatch || 
|- id="1995 SZ8" bgcolor=#fefefe
| 0 ||  || MBA-I || 18.9 || data-sort-value="0.49" | 490 m || multiple || 1995–2020 || 26 Jan 2020 || 35 || align=left | Disc.: SpacewatchAlt.: 2007 VS99 || 
|- id="1995 SC9" bgcolor=#E9E9E9
| 2 ||  || MBA-M || 18.7 || 1.0 km || multiple || 1995–2022 || 16 Sep 2022 || 26 || align=left | Disc.: Spacewatch || 
|- id="1995 SH9" bgcolor=#fefefe
| 0 ||  || MBA-I || 18.4 || data-sort-value="0.62" | 620 m || multiple || 1995–2020 || 05 Nov 2020 || 74 || align=left | Disc.: SpacewatchAlt.: 2005 JY95, 2015 BP420 || 
|- id="1995 SJ9" bgcolor=#d6d6d6
| 0 ||  || MBA-O || 16.8 || 2.4 km || multiple || 1995–2018 || 15 Oct 2018 || 34 || align=left | Disc.: SpacewatchAdded on 17 January 2021Alt.: 2016 EE276 || 
|- id="1995 SS9" bgcolor=#fefefe
| 0 ||  || MBA-I || 18.8 || data-sort-value="0.52" | 520 m || multiple || 1995–2019 || 02 Dec 2019 || 43 || align=left | Disc.: Spacewatch || 
|- id="1995 SG11" bgcolor=#FA8072
| 0 ||  || MCA || 19.0 || data-sort-value="0.47" | 470 m || multiple || 1995–2019 || 04 Dec 2019 || 67 || align=left | Disc.: Spacewatch || 
|- id="1995 SH11" bgcolor=#E9E9E9
| 0 ||  || MBA-M || 17.7 || 1.6 km || multiple || 1995–2018 || 12 Jul 2018 || 42 || align=left | Disc.: Spacewatch || 
|- id="1995 SW11" bgcolor=#fefefe
| 0 ||  || MBA-I || 18.6 || data-sort-value="0.57" | 570 m || multiple || 1995–2020 || 26 Sep 2020 || 46 || align=left | Disc.: SpacewatchAdded on 17 January 2021 || 
|- id="1995 SP12" bgcolor=#E9E9E9
| 0 ||  || MBA-M || 18.32 || data-sort-value="0.91" | 910 m || multiple || 1995–2021 || 31 Oct 2021 || 82 || align=left | Disc.: SpacewatchAlt.: 2008 VU15 || 
|- id="1995 SS12" bgcolor=#d6d6d6
| 0 ||  || MBA-O || 16.51 || 2.8 km || multiple || 1993–2021 || 08 Apr 2021 || 210 || align=left | Disc.: Spacewatch || 
|- id="1995 SZ12" bgcolor=#d6d6d6
| 0 ||  || MBA-O || 16.84 || 2.4 km || multiple || 1995–2021 || 01 Nov 2021 || 98 || align=left | Disc.: SpacewatchAlt.: 2011 UG71 || 
|- id="1995 SA13" bgcolor=#fefefe
| 0 ||  || MBA-I || 19.53 || data-sort-value="0.37" | 370 m || multiple || 1995–2020 || 11 Dec 2020 || 70 || align=left | Disc.: Spacewatch || 
|- id="1995 SD13" bgcolor=#fefefe
| 0 ||  || MBA-I || 18.8 || data-sort-value="0.52" | 520 m || multiple || 1995–2019 || 26 Sep 2019 || 50 || align=left | Disc.: SpacewatchAlt.: 2011 CQ102, 2012 PY10, 2015 KL74 || 
|- id="1995 SQ13" bgcolor=#E9E9E9
| 0 ||  || MBA-M || 18.0 || 1.1 km || multiple || 1995–2020 || 15 Sep 2020 || 70 || align=left | Disc.: Spacewatch || 
|- id="1995 SV13" bgcolor=#E9E9E9
| 2 ||  || MBA-M || 17.9 || 1.1 km || multiple || 1995–2021 || 30 Nov 2021 || 52 || align=left | Disc.: SpacewatchAdded on 24 December 2021 || 
|- id="1995 SB14" bgcolor=#d6d6d6
| 0 ||  || MBA-O || 17.49 || 1.8 km || multiple || 1995–2021 || 09 Jul 2021 || 59 || align=left | Disc.: SpacewatchAlt.: 2006 UJ115 || 
|- id="1995 SN14" bgcolor=#fefefe
| – ||  || MBA-I || 19.9 || data-sort-value="0.31" | 310 m || single || 9 days || 27 Sep 1995 || 8 || align=left | Disc.: Spacewatch || 
|- id="1995 SK15" bgcolor=#d6d6d6
| 0 ||  || MBA-O || 17.87 || 1.5 km || multiple || 1995–2022 || 30 Jul 2022 || 51 || align=left | Disc.: SpacewatchAlt.: 2006 RV84, 2011 FK172, 2017 UV79 || 
|- id="1995 SQ15" bgcolor=#fefefe
| 0 ||  || MBA-I || 18.33 || data-sort-value="0.47" | 620 m || multiple || 1995-2022 || 24 Oct 2022 || 67 || align=left | Disc.: SpacewatchAlt.: 2022 QN36 || 
|- id="1995 SZ15" bgcolor=#fefefe
| 1 ||  || MBA-I || 19.1 || data-sort-value="0.45" | 450 m || multiple || 1995–2018 || 05 Nov 2018 || 27 || align=left | Disc.: SpacewatchAlt.: 2014 PQ90 || 
|- id="1995 SJ16" bgcolor=#fefefe
| 0 ||  || MBA-I || 19.21 || data-sort-value="0.43" | 430 m || multiple || 1995–2021 || 30 Nov 2021 || 64 || align=left | Disc.: SpacewatchAdded on 5 November 2021 || 
|- id="1995 SQ16" bgcolor=#d6d6d6
| 0 ||  || MBA-O || 16.6 || 2.7 km || multiple || 1995–2021 || 15 Apr 2021 || 45 || align=left | Disc.: SpacewatchAdded on 21 August 2021Alt.: 2015 FO49 || 
|- id="1995 SZ16" bgcolor=#d6d6d6
| 0 ||  || MBA-O || 16.9 || 2.3 km || multiple || 1995–2021 || 08 Jun 2021 || 36 || align=left | Disc.: SpacewatchAlt.: 2017 RH130 || 
|- id="1995 SB17" bgcolor=#fefefe
| 0 ||  || MBA-I || 18.66 || data-sort-value="0.55" | 550 m || multiple || 1995–2021 || 12 Aug 2021 || 45 || align=left | Disc.: SpacewatchAlt.: 2018 PD59 || 
|- id="1995 SU17" bgcolor=#fefefe
| 0 ||  || MBA-I || 18.5 || data-sort-value="0.59" | 590 m || multiple || 1995–2021 || 11 Jan 2021 || 48 || align=left | Disc.: SpacewatchAdded on 24 August 2020 || 
|- id="1995 SG18" bgcolor=#fefefe
| – ||  || MBA-I || 19.4 || data-sort-value="0.39" | 390 m || single || 7 days || 25 Sep 1995 || 9 || align=left | Disc.: Spacewatch || 
|- id="1995 SJ19" bgcolor=#d6d6d6
| 0 ||  || MBA-O || 17.00 || 2.2 km || multiple || 1995–2021 || 08 Sep 2021 || 88 || align=left | Disc.: SpacewatchAdded on 22 July 2020 || 
|- id="1995 SK22" bgcolor=#d6d6d6
| – ||  || MBA-O || 17.7 || 1.6 km || single || 11 days || 30 Sep 1995 || 9 || align=left | Disc.: Spacewatch || 
|- id="1995 SF23" bgcolor=#E9E9E9
| 0 ||  || MBA-M || 17.66 || 1.2 km || multiple || 1995–2021 || 08 Sep 2021 || 100 || align=left | Disc.: Spacewatch || 
|- id="1995 SG23" bgcolor=#d6d6d6
| 0 ||  || MBA-O || 16.75 || 2.5 km || multiple || 1995–2021 || 08 Dec 2021 || 147 || align=left | Disc.: SpacewatchAlt.: 2005 RS58 || 
|- id="1995 SZ23" bgcolor=#fefefe
| 1 ||  || MBA-I || 19.4 || data-sort-value="0.39" | 390 m || multiple || 1995–2020 || 22 Apr 2020 || 24 || align=left | Disc.: Spacewatch || 
|- id="1995 SB24" bgcolor=#E9E9E9
| 1 ||  || MBA-M || 18.0 || data-sort-value="0.75" | 750 m || multiple || 1995–2019 || 01 Jul 2019 || 61 || align=left | Disc.: Spacewatch || 
|- id="1995 SF24" bgcolor=#fefefe
| 0 ||  || MBA-I || 17.8 || data-sort-value="0.82" | 820 m || multiple || 1995–2021 || 13 Jan 2021 || 134 || align=left | Disc.: Spacewatch || 
|- id="1995 SU24" bgcolor=#E9E9E9
| – ||  || MBA-M || 19.0 || data-sort-value="0.47" | 470 m || single || 11 days || 30 Sep 1995 || 9 || align=left | Disc.: Spacewatch || 
|- id="1995 SB29" bgcolor=#FA8072
| 2 ||  || MCA || 18.44 || 800 m || multiple || 1995–2022 || 26 Nov 2022 || 37 || align=left | Disc.: SpacewatchMBA at MPC || 
|- id="1995 SU31" bgcolor=#E9E9E9
| 0 ||  || MBA-M || 18.28 || data-sort-value="0.93" | 930 m || multiple || 1995–2021 || 28 Oct 2021 || 80 || align=left | Disc.: SpacewatchAdded on 30 September 2021Alt.: 2017 UK151 || 
|- id="1995 SC32" bgcolor=#d6d6d6
| 0 ||  || MBA-O || 17.64 || 1.7 km || multiple || 1995–2021 || 08 Dec 2021 || 56 || align=left | Disc.: SpacewatchAdded on 24 August 2020 || 
|- id="1995 SL33" bgcolor=#fefefe
| 0 ||  || MBA-I || 18.18 || data-sort-value="0.69" | 690 m || multiple || 1995–2021 || 03 May 2021 || 45 || align=left | Disc.: Spacewatch || 
|- id="1995 SM33" bgcolor=#d6d6d6
| 0 ||  || MBA-O || 17.3 || 1.9 km || multiple || 1995–2018 || 09 Nov 2018 || 28 || align=left | Disc.: Spacewatch || 
|- id="1995 SR33" bgcolor=#d6d6d6
| – ||  || MBA-O || 18.2 || 1.3 km || single || 9 days || 27 Sep 1995 || 9 || align=left | Disc.: Spacewatch || 
|- id="1995 SX33" bgcolor=#fefefe
| 0 ||  || MBA-I || 19.0 || data-sort-value="0.47" | 470 m || multiple || 1995–2020 || 19 Jan 2020 || 54 || align=left | Disc.: Spacewatch || 
|- id="1995 SD34" bgcolor=#d6d6d6
| 3 ||  || MBA-O || 17.7 || 1.6 km || multiple || 1995–2018 || 05 Oct 2018 || 31 || align=left | Disc.: Spacewatch || 
|- id="1995 SF34" bgcolor=#fefefe
| 1 ||  || MBA-I || 18.7 || data-sort-value="0.54" | 540 m || multiple || 1995-2021 || 12 Aug 2021 || 34 || align=left | Disc.: Spacewatch Alt.: 2014 WE599 || 
|- id="1995 SH34" bgcolor=#E9E9E9
| 3 ||  || MBA-M || 18.6 || 1.1 km || multiple || 1995–2009 || 25 Sep 2009 || 15 || align=left | Disc.: SpacewatchAlt.: 2009 SP173 || 
|- id="1995 SZ34" bgcolor=#fefefe
| 1 ||  || MBA-I || 19.36 || data-sort-value="0.40" | 400 m || multiple || 1995–2021 || 15 Apr 2021 || 41 || align=left | Disc.: SpacewatchAlt.: 2005 SY36 || 
|- id="1995 SG35" bgcolor=#E9E9E9
| 0 ||  || MBA-M || 16.92 || 2.3 km || multiple || 1995–2021 || 12 May 2021 || 164 || align=left | Disc.: SpacewatchAlt.: 2014 YS17 || 
|- id="1995 SO35" bgcolor=#E9E9E9
| 0 ||  || MBA-M || 17.2 || 1.5 km || multiple || 1995–2020 || 11 May 2020 || 43 || align=left | Disc.: SpacewatchAlt.: 2015 BV402 || 
|- id="1995 SU36" bgcolor=#d6d6d6
| 0 ||  || MBA-O || 17.87 || 1.5 km || multiple || 1995–2021 || 08 Jun 2021 || 34 || align=left | Disc.: SpacewatchAdded on 22 July 2020Alt.: 2011 OU69 || 
|- id="1995 SG37" bgcolor=#fefefe
| 0 ||  || MBA-I || 18.8 || data-sort-value="0.52" | 520 m || multiple || 1995–2019 || 27 Nov 2019 || 67 || align=left | Disc.: SpacewatchAlt.: 2012 QY4 || 
|- id="1995 SU39" bgcolor=#FA8072
| 1 ||  || MCA || 19.18 || data-sort-value="0.47" | 440 m || multiple || 1995–2022 || 31 Jul 2022 || 37 || align=left | Disc.: SpacewatchAdded on 5 November 2021 || 
|- id="1995 SU40" bgcolor=#d6d6d6
| – ||  || MBA-O || 17.1 || 2.1 km || single || 11 days || 30 Sep 1995 || 9 || align=left | Disc.: Spacewatch || 
|- id="1995 SH41" bgcolor=#FA8072
| 0 ||  || MCA || 18.67 || data-sort-value="0.55" | 550 m || multiple || 1995–2021 || 02 Dec 2021 || 128 || align=left | Disc.: SpacewatchAlt.: 2006 SV349, 2015 EP69 || 
|- id="1995 SH42" bgcolor=#d6d6d6
| 0 ||  || MBA-O || 17.75 || 1.6 km || multiple || 1995–2021 || 04 Sep 2021 || 53 || align=left | Disc.: Spacewatch || 
|- id="1995 SL42" bgcolor=#d6d6d6
| 2 ||  || MBA-O || 17.3 || 1.9 km || multiple || 1995–2020 || 15 Oct 2020 || 52 || align=left | Disc.: SpacewatchAdded on 19 October 2020 || 
|- id="1995 SO42" bgcolor=#d6d6d6
| 0 ||  || MBA-O || 17.41 || 1.8 km || multiple || 1995–2021 || 03 Oct 2021 || 50 || align=left | Disc.: SpacewatchAlt.: 2016 TX14 || 
|- id="1995 SR42" bgcolor=#fefefe
| 0 ||  || MBA-I || 18.5 || data-sort-value="0.59" | 590 m || multiple || 1995–2020 || 14 Sep 2020 || 53 || align=left | Disc.: SpacewatchAlt.: 2016 LD80 || 
|- id="1995 SZ42" bgcolor=#E9E9E9
| 0 ||  = (619154) || MBA-M || 17.3 || 1.9 km || multiple || 1995–2020 || 31 Oct 2022 || 108 || align=left | Disc.: Spacewatch || 
|- id="1995 SA43" bgcolor=#fefefe
| 1 ||  || MBA-I || 19.33 || data-sort-value="0.40" | 400 m || multiple || 1995–2021 || 02 Oct 2021 || 45 || align=left | Disc.: SpacewatchAlt.: 2010 TJ49 || 
|- id="1995 SP43" bgcolor=#fefefe
| 0 ||  || MBA-I || 18.80 || data-sort-value="0.52" | 520 m || multiple || 1995–2022 || 07 Jan 2022 || 91 || align=left | Disc.: SpacewatchAlt.: 2015 BF589 || 
|- id="1995 SS43" bgcolor=#fefefe
| 0 ||  || MBA-I || 18.6 || data-sort-value="0.57" | 570 m || multiple || 1995–2021 || 14 Nov 2021 || 51 || align=left | Disc.: SpacewatchAdded on 24 December 2021 || 
|- id="1995 SW44" bgcolor=#fefefe
| 0 ||  || MBA-I || 19.1 || data-sort-value="0.45" | 450 m || multiple || 1995–2019 || 23 Sep 2019 || 38 || align=left | Disc.: SpacewatchAlt.: 2009 WK178 || 
|- id="1995 SZ44" bgcolor=#E9E9E9
| 0 ||  || MBA-M || 17.41 || data-sort-value="0.98" | 980 m || multiple || 1995–2020 || 15 Dec 2020 || 54 || align=left | Disc.: Spacewatch || 
|- id="1995 SD45" bgcolor=#fefefe
| 4 ||  || MBA-I || 18.8 || data-sort-value="0.52" | 520 m || multiple || 1995–2016 || 05 Nov 2016 || 36 || align=left | Disc.: Spacewatch || 
|- id="1995 SQ46" bgcolor=#fefefe
| 0 ||  || MBA-I || 19.25 || data-sort-value="0.43" | 430 m || multiple || 1995–2022 || 31 Jul 2022 || 43 || align=left | Disc.: SpacewatchAlt.: 2012 RA19 || 
|- id="1995 SU46" bgcolor=#E9E9E9
| 0 ||  || MBA-M || 17.2 || 1.1 km || multiple || 1995–2021 || 16 Jan 2021 || 106 || align=left | Disc.: SpacewatchAdded on 30 September 2021Alt.: 2005 AM40, 2009 BN213 || 
|- id="1995 SF47" bgcolor=#d6d6d6
| 0 ||  || MBA-O || 16.73 || 2.5 km || multiple || 1995–2021 || 05 Nov 2021 || 143 || align=left | Disc.: Spacewatch || 
|- id="1995 SJ47" bgcolor=#d6d6d6
| 2 ||  || MBA-O || 17.77 || 1.6 km || multiple || 1995–2021 || 04 Oct 2021 || 37 || align=left | Disc.: SpacewatchAdded on 5 November 2021Alt.: 2016 SX106 || 
|- id="1995 SL47" bgcolor=#fefefe
| 0 ||  || MBA-I || 18.7 || data-sort-value="0.54" | 540 m || multiple || 1995–2021 || 06 Oct 2021 || 31 || align=left | Disc.: SpacewatchAdded on 5 November 2021Alt.: 2021 QB55 || 
|- id="1995 SZ47" bgcolor=#E9E9E9
| 0 ||  || MBA-M || 17.2 || 1.1 km || multiple || 1995–2021 || 12 Jan 2021 || 124 || align=left | Disc.: Spacewatch || 
|- id="1995 SJ48" bgcolor=#fefefe
| 0 ||  || MBA-I || 19.33 || data-sort-value="0.40" | 400 m || multiple || 1995–2021 || 29 Nov 2021 || 33 || align=left | Disc.: Spacewatch || 
|- id="1995 SA49" bgcolor=#fefefe
| 0 ||  || MBA-I || 19.35 || data-sort-value="0.40" | 400 m || multiple || 1995–2021 || 28 Nov 2021 || 57 || align=left | Disc.: SpacewatchAdded on 11 May 2021Alt.: 2011 QE29 || 
|- id="1995 SO49" bgcolor=#E9E9E9
| 0 ||  || MBA-M || 17.7 || 1.6 km || multiple || 1995–2021 || 07 Apr 2021 || 45 || align=left | Disc.: SpacewatchAdded on 21 August 2021 || 
|- id="1995 SB50" bgcolor=#FA8072
| 1 ||  || MCA || 18.8 || data-sort-value="0.52" | 520 m || multiple || 1995–2020 || 24 Dec 2020 || 31 || align=left | Disc.: SpacewatchAlt.: 1998 SM18 || 
|- id="1995 SC50" bgcolor=#E9E9E9
| 0 ||  || MBA-M || 17.0 || 1.2 km || multiple || 1995–2021 || 18 Jan 2021 || 134 || align=left | Disc.: Spacewatch || 
|- id="1995 SY50" bgcolor=#d6d6d6
| 0 ||  || MBA-O || 17.49 || 1.8 km || multiple || 1995–2021 || 26 Nov 2021 || 40 || align=left | Disc.: SpacewatchAdded on 24 December 2021 || 
|- id="1995 SF51" bgcolor=#E9E9E9
| 0 ||  || MBA-M || 17.6 || data-sort-value="0.90" | 900 m || multiple || 1995–2020 || 11 Dec 2020 || 75 || align=left | Disc.: Spacewatch || 
|- id="1995 SQ51" bgcolor=#d6d6d6
| 0 ||  || MBA-O || 17.12 || 2.1 km || multiple || 1995–2022 || 25 Jan 2022 || 73 || align=left | Disc.: Spacewatch || 
|- id="1995 SG52" bgcolor=#E9E9E9
| 0 ||  || MBA-M || 17.64 || data-sort-value="0.88" | 880 m || multiple || 1995–2020 || 16 Nov 2020 || 77 || align=left | Disc.: SpacewatchAdded on 17 January 2021Alt.: 2016 VQ34 || 
|- id="1995 SS55" bgcolor=#d6d6d6
| 2 ||  || MBA-O || 18.18 || 1.4 km || multiple || 1995–2022 || 28 Sep 2022 || 31 || align=left | Disc.: SpacewatchAdded on 22 July 2020 || 
|- id="1995 SV55" bgcolor=#E9E9E9
| 0 ||  || MBA-M || 17.52 || 1.3 km || multiple || 1995–2021 || 02 Dec 2021 || 110 || align=left | Disc.: SpacewatchAlt.: 2008 SS112, 2010 CM119 || 
|- id="1995 SY55" bgcolor=#d6d6d6
| 1 ||  || MBA-O || 17.34 || 1.9 km || multiple || 1995–2019 || 25 Nov 2019 || 48 || align=left | Disc.: SpacewatchAdded on 17 June 2021Alt.: 2003 SJ412, 2011 SC98 || 
|- id="1995 SE56" bgcolor=#d6d6d6
| 0 ||  || MBA-O || 17.05 || 2.2 km || multiple || 1995–2021 || 27 Nov 2021 || 94 || align=left | Disc.: SpacewatchAdded on 30 September 2021 || 
|- id="1995 ST56" bgcolor=#E9E9E9
| 1 ||  || MBA-M || 18.4 || data-sort-value="0.88" | 880 m || multiple || 1995–2021 || 06 Nov 2021 || 41 || align=left | Disc.: SpacewatchAdded on 29 January 2022 || 
|- id="1995 SX56" bgcolor=#d6d6d6
| 0 ||  || MBA-O || 16.64 || 2.6 km || multiple || 1995–2021 || 15 Apr 2021 || 71 || align=left | Disc.: SpacewatchAdded on 21 August 2021Alt.: 2012 PH3, 2015 FH363 || 
|- id="1995 SA57" bgcolor=#E9E9E9
| 0 ||  || MBA-M || 18.01 || 1.1 km || multiple || 1995–2021 || 16 Oct 2021 || 100 || align=left | Disc.: SpacewatchAdded on 22 July 2020 || 
|- id="1995 SC57" bgcolor=#d6d6d6
| 0 ||  || MBA-O || 17.33 || 1.9 km || multiple || 1995–2021 || 16 May 2021 || 91 || align=left | Disc.: Spacewatch || 
|- id="1995 SM57" bgcolor=#fefefe
| 1 ||  || MBA-I || 19.0 || data-sort-value="0.47" | 470 m || multiple || 1995–2015 || 10 Oct 2015 || 48 || align=left | Disc.: SpacewatchAlt.: 2015 PV155 || 
|- id="1995 ST57" bgcolor=#fefefe
| 0 ||  || MBA-I || 19.81 || data-sort-value="0.32" | 320 m || multiple || 1995–2021 || 09 May 2021 || 44 || align=left | Disc.: SpacewatchAlt.: 2005 SF224 || 
|- id="1995 SW57" bgcolor=#E9E9E9
| 1 ||  || MBA-M || 18.7 || data-sort-value="0.54" | 540 m || multiple || 1995–2020 || 15 Sep 2020 || 35 || align=left | Disc.: SpacewatchAdded on 17 January 2021Alt.: 2016 PO168 || 
|- id="1995 SX57" bgcolor=#d6d6d6
| 0 ||  || MBA-O || 17.05 || 2.2 km || multiple || 1995–2021 || 10 May 2021 || 66 || align=left | Disc.: SpacewatchAdded on 22 July 2020 || 
|- id="1995 SA58" bgcolor=#E9E9E9
| 0 ||  || MBA-M || 17.49 || data-sort-value="0.94" | 940 m || multiple || 1995–2022 || 23 Jan 2022 || 72 || align=left | Disc.: Spacewatch || 
|- id="1995 SE58" bgcolor=#fefefe
| 0 ||  || MBA-I || 18.7 || data-sort-value="0.54" | 540 m || multiple || 1995–2021 || 08 May 2021 || 45 || align=left | Disc.: SpacewatchAdded on 17 June 2021 || 
|- id="1995 SN58" bgcolor=#d6d6d6
| 0 ||  || MBA-O || 16.5 || 2.8 km || multiple || 1995–2020 || 23 Jan 2020 || 67 || align=left | Disc.: Spacewatch || 
|- id="1995 SU58" bgcolor=#d6d6d6
| 0 ||  || MBA-O || 17.41 || 1.9 km || multiple || 1995-2022 || 19 Sep 2022 || 59 || align=left | Disc.: Spacewatch || 
|- id="1995 SV58" bgcolor=#fefefe
| 0 ||  || MBA-I || 18.58 || data-sort-value="0.57" | 570 m || multiple || 1995–2020 || 16 Nov 2020 || 72 || align=left | Disc.: SpacewatchAlt.: 2005 GN171 || 
|- id="1995 SY58" bgcolor=#d6d6d6
| 0 ||  || MBA-O || 17.1 || 2.1 km || multiple || 1995-2018 || 28 Nov 2018 || 54 || align=left | Disc.: Spacewatch Alt.: 2009 DH161 || 
|- id="1995 SA59" bgcolor=#d6d6d6
| 0 ||  || MBA-O || 17.5 || 1.8 km || multiple || 1995–2020 || 27 Feb 2020 || 48 || align=left | Disc.: Spacewatch || 
|- id="1995 SR59" bgcolor=#E9E9E9
| 0 ||  || MBA-M || 16.78 || 1.3 km || multiple || 1995–2022 || 26 Jan 2022 || 70 || align=left | Disc.: SpacewatchAlt.: 2014 EP101 || 
|- id="1995 SP60" bgcolor=#E9E9E9
| 0 ||  || MBA-M || 17.33 || 1.4 km || multiple || 1995–2021 || 29 Oct 2021 || 94 || align=left | Disc.: Spacewatch || 
|- id="1995 SX60" bgcolor=#d6d6d6
| 0 ||  || MBA-O || 17.29 || 1.9 km || multiple || 1995–2019 || 14 Jan 2019 || 74 || align=left | Disc.: SpacewatchAlt.: 2006 SJ320 || 
|- id="1995 SA62" bgcolor=#E9E9E9
| 2 ||  || MBA-M || 18.2 || data-sort-value="0.68" | 680 m || multiple || 1995–2021 || 04 Jan 2021 || 26 || align=left | Disc.: SpacewatchAdded on 17 January 2021 || 
|- id="1995 SG62" bgcolor=#d6d6d6
| 2 ||  || HIL || 16.8 || 2.4 km || multiple || 1995–2019 || 28 Nov 2019 || 42 || align=left | Disc.: SpacewatchAdded on 17 June 2021Alt.: 2003 SY378 || 
|- id="1995 SE63" bgcolor=#fefefe
| 0 ||  || MBA-I || 18.3 || data-sort-value="0.65" | 650 m || multiple || 1995–2021 || 11 Jan 2021 || 39 || align=left | Disc.: Spacewatch || 
|- id="1995 ST63" bgcolor=#E9E9E9
| 0 ||  || MBA-M || 17.58 || 1.3 km || multiple || 1995–2021 || 29 Sep 2021 || 43 || align=left | Disc.: SpacewatchAdded on 22 July 2020 || 
|- id="1995 SS64" bgcolor=#fefefe
| 0 ||  || MBA-I || 18.89 || data-sort-value="0.50" | 500 m || multiple || 1995–2021 || 09 Nov 2021 || 64 || align=left | Disc.: SpacewatchAlt.: 2010 VM236 || 
|- id="1995 SA65" bgcolor=#d6d6d6
| 0 ||  || MBA-O || 16.95 || 2.3 km || multiple || 1995–2021 || 29 Nov 2021 || 143 || align=left | Disc.: Spacewatch || 
|- id="1995 SB65" bgcolor=#d6d6d6
| 0 ||  = (619155) || MBA-O || 16.5 || 2.8 km || multiple || 1995–2021 || 01 Nov 2022 || 179 || align=left | Disc.: Spacewatch || 
|- id="1995 SD65" bgcolor=#fefefe
| 2 ||  || MBA-I || 19.7 || data-sort-value="0.34" | 340 m || multiple || 1995–2020 || 05 Nov 2020 || 51 || align=left | Disc.: SpacewatchAlt.: 2013 VF60 || 
|- id="1995 SE65" bgcolor=#fefefe
| 2 ||  || MBA-I || 19.1 || data-sort-value="0.45" | 450 m || multiple || 1995–2020 || 23 Oct 2020 || 34 || align=left | Disc.: Spacewatch || 
|- id="1995 SV65" bgcolor=#E9E9E9
| 0 ||  || MBA-M || 17.6 || 1.7 km || multiple || 1995–2020 || 19 Jan 2020 || 78 || align=left | Disc.: Spacewatch || 
|- id="1995 SL66" bgcolor=#fefefe
| 2 ||  || MBA-I || 20.0 || data-sort-value="0.30" | 300 m || multiple || 1995–2022 || 17 Sep 2022 || 28 || align=left | Disc.: Spacewatch || 
|- id="1995 SS66" bgcolor=#E9E9E9
| 0 ||  || MBA-M || 17.9 || data-sort-value="0.78" | 780 m || multiple || 1995–2020 || 23 Nov 2020 || 46 || align=left | Disc.: SpacewatchAlt.: 2015 PH234 || 
|- id="1995 SG67" bgcolor=#E9E9E9
| 0 ||  || MBA-M || 18.6 || data-sort-value="0.80" | 800 m || multiple || 1995–2020 || 17 Sep 2020 || 57 || align=left | Disc.: SpacewatchAdded on 19 October 2020 || 
|- id="1995 SS67" bgcolor=#fefefe
| 1 ||  || MBA-I || 19.35 || data-sort-value="0.40" | 400 m || multiple || 1995–2021 || 06 Oct 2021 || 133 || align=left | Disc.: SpacewatchAlt.: 2008 RU127 || 
|- id="1995 SV67" bgcolor=#d6d6d6
| 3 ||  || MBA-O || 18.0 || 1.4 km || multiple || 1995–2017 || 13 Nov 2017 || 23 || align=left | Disc.: SpacewatchAdded on 22 July 2020 || 
|- id="1995 SD68" bgcolor=#fefefe
| 1 ||  || MBA-I || 18.7 || data-sort-value="0.54" | 540 m || multiple || 1995–2020 || 26 Sep 2020 || 42 || align=left | Disc.: SpacewatchAdded on 17 January 2021 || 
|- id="1995 SX68" bgcolor=#E9E9E9
| – ||  || MBA-M || 18.7 || data-sort-value="0.76" | 760 m || single || 10 days || 27 Sep 1995 || 9 || align=left | Disc.: Spacewatch || 
|- id="1995 SF69" bgcolor=#fefefe
| 0 ||  || MBA-I || 19.86 || data-sort-value="0.32" | 320 m || multiple || 1995–2021 || 28 Nov 2021 || 33 || align=left | Disc.: Spacewatch || 
|- id="1995 SG69" bgcolor=#d6d6d6
| 0 ||  || MBA-O || 17.17 || 2.0 km || multiple || 1995–2021 || 28 Nov 2021 || 114 || align=left | Disc.: SpacewatchAlt.: 2010 KV147, 2013 DC11, 2015 PY252 || 
|- id="1995 SL69" bgcolor=#E9E9E9
| – ||  || MBA-M || 19.6 || data-sort-value="0.67" | 670 m || single || 11 days || 29 Sep 1995 || 9 || align=left | Disc.: Spacewatch || 
|- id="1995 SO69" bgcolor=#d6d6d6
| 0 ||  || MBA-O || 17.57 || 1.7 km || multiple || 1995–2021 || 28 Sep 2021 || 70 || align=left | Disc.: Spacewatch || 
|- id="1995 SR69" bgcolor=#fefefe
| 0 ||  || MBA-I || 19.3 || data-sort-value="0.41" | 410 m || multiple || 1995–2021 || 30 Nov 2021 || 54 || align=left | Disc.: SpacewatchAdded on 24 December 2021 || 
|- id="1995 SU69" bgcolor=#d6d6d6
| 0 ||  || MBA-O || 16.88 || 2.3 km || multiple || 1995–2021 || 08 Sep 2021 || 67 || align=left | Disc.: SpacewatchAlt.: 2011 SD307 || 
|- id="1995 SF70" bgcolor=#d6d6d6
| 2 ||  || MBA-O || 17.7 || 1.6 km || multiple || 1995–2021 || 05 Dec 2021 || 26 || align=left | Disc.: SpacewatchAdded on 29 January 2022 || 
|- id="1995 SQ70" bgcolor=#d6d6d6
| 0 ||  || MBA-O || 17.58 || 1.7 km || multiple || 1995–2021 || 10 Aug 2021 || 44 || align=left | Disc.: SpacewatchAdded on 21 August 2021 || 
|- id="1995 SF71" bgcolor=#E9E9E9
| 0 ||  || MBA-M || 18.31 || data-sort-value="0.92" | 920 m || multiple || 1995–2021 || 06 Jun 2021 || 33 || align=left | Disc.: SpacewatchAdded on 21 August 2021 || 
|- id="1995 SO71" bgcolor=#E9E9E9
| 0 ||  || MBA-M || 17.3 || 1.9 km || multiple || 1995–2020 || 21 Apr 2020 || 95 || align=left | Disc.: SpacewatchAdded on 22 July 2020Alt.: 2011 EL64 || 
|- id="1995 SP71" bgcolor=#E9E9E9
| 0 ||  || MBA-M || 17.6 || data-sort-value="0.90" | 900 m || multiple || 1995–2020 || 11 Dec 2020 || 83 || align=left | Disc.: Spacewatch || 
|- id="1995 SH72" bgcolor=#E9E9E9
| 0 ||  || MBA-M || 17.8 || data-sort-value="0.82" | 820 m || multiple || 1995–2020 || 13 Nov 2020 || 189 || align=left | Disc.: SpacewatchAlt.: 2011 KU41 || 
|- id="1995 SP72" bgcolor=#E9E9E9
| 1 ||  || MBA-M || 19.0 || data-sort-value="0.55" | 600 m || multiple || 1995-2020 || 22 Jul 2020 || 32 || align=left | Disc.: Spacewatch Alt.: 2012 SP99 || 
|- id="1995 ST72" bgcolor=#E9E9E9
| 0 ||  || MBA-M || 17.72 || 1.6 km || multiple || 1995–2021 || 08 May 2021 || 70 || align=left | Disc.: SpacewatchAdded on 22 July 2020Alt.: 2011 BY159, 2014 WL442 || 
|- id="1995 SV72" bgcolor=#E9E9E9
| 0 ||  || MBA-M || 17.53 || 1.7 km || multiple || 1995–2021 || 03 May 2021 || 49 || align=left | Disc.: SpacewatchAdded on 17 June 2021 || 
|- id="1995 SG73" bgcolor=#fefefe
| 1 ||  || MBA-I || 18.8 || data-sort-value="0.52" | 520 m || multiple || 1995–2018 || 05 Oct 2018 || 43 || align=left | Disc.: Spacewatch || 
|- id="1995 SR73" bgcolor=#fefefe
| 0 ||  || MBA-I || 18.7 || data-sort-value="0.54" | 540 m || multiple || 1995–2019 || 14 Jan 2019 || 52 || align=left | Disc.: SpacewatchAlt.: 2010 TB9 || 
|- id="1995 SH74" bgcolor=#E9E9E9
| 2 ||  || MBA-M || 19.00 || data-sort-value="0.47" | 470 m || multiple || 1995–2020 || 11 Dec 2020 || 36 || align=left | Disc.: SpacewatchAdded on 17 January 2021 || 
|- id="1995 SN74" bgcolor=#fefefe
| 0 ||  || MBA-I || 18.97 || data-sort-value="0.48" | 480 m || multiple || 1995–2020 || 24 Nov 2020 || 65 || align=left | Disc.: SpacewatchAdded on 9 March 2021Alt.: 2020 TQ16 || 
|- id="1995 SU74" bgcolor=#d6d6d6
| 0 ||  || MBA-O || 17.5 || 1.8 km || multiple || 1995–2019 || 23 Oct 2019 || 38 || align=left | Disc.: SpacewatchAdded on 11 May 2021Alt.: 2014 SN52 || 
|- id="1995 SA75" bgcolor=#fefefe
| 0 ||  || MBA-I || 18.9 || data-sort-value="0.49" | 490 m || multiple || 1995–2020 || 16 Aug 2020 || 43 || align=left | Disc.: Spacewatch || 
|- id="1995 SL75" bgcolor=#fefefe
| 0 ||  || MBA-I || 18.6 || data-sort-value="0.57" | 570 m || multiple || 1995–2021 || 10 Apr 2021 || 38 || align=left | Disc.: SpacewatchAdded on 21 August 2021 || 
|- id="1995 SK76" bgcolor=#d6d6d6
| – ||  || MBA-O || 18.5 || 1.1 km || single || 10 days || 30 Sep 1995 || 9 || align=left | Disc.: Spacewatch || 
|- id="1995 ST76" bgcolor=#E9E9E9
| 0 ||  || MBA-M || 17.7 || data-sort-value="0.86" | 860 m || multiple || 1995–2020 || 17 Oct 2020 || 116 || align=left | Disc.: SpacewatchAlt.: 2015 FU78 || 
|- id="1995 SZ76" bgcolor=#fefefe
| 0 ||  || MBA-I || 18.6 || data-sort-value="0.57" | 570 m || multiple || 1995–2020 || 24 Aug 2020 || 44 || align=left | Disc.: SpacewatchAdded on 19 October 2020Alt.: 2016 JP47 || 
|- id="1995 SP77" bgcolor=#E9E9E9
| 3 ||  || MBA-M || 18.8 || data-sort-value="0.52" | 520 m || multiple || 1995–2020 || 05 Nov 2020 || 70 || align=left | Disc.: SpacewatchAdded on 17 January 2021Alt.: 2016 TB139 || 
|- id="1995 SS77" bgcolor=#d6d6d6
| 0 ||  || MBA-O || 17.41 || 1.8 km || multiple || 1995–2021 || 26 Oct 2021 || 69 || align=left | Disc.: SpacewatchAlt.: 2011 UL455 || 
|- id="1995 SZ77" bgcolor=#E9E9E9
| 2 ||  || MBA-M || 18.2 || data-sort-value="0.68" | 680 m || multiple || 1995–2020 || 15 Oct 2020 || 47 || align=left | Disc.: SpacewatchAdded on 17 January 2021 || 
|- id="1995 SB78" bgcolor=#fefefe
| 0 ||  || MBA-I || 18.4 || data-sort-value="0.62" | 620 m || multiple || 1995–2020 || 12 Sep 2020 || 67 || align=left | Disc.: Spacewatch || 
|- id="1995 SU78" bgcolor=#FA8072
| – ||  || MCA || 20.3 || data-sort-value="0.26" | 260 m || single || 10 days || 30 Sep 1995 || 8 || align=left | Disc.: Spacewatch || 
|- id="1995 SW78" bgcolor=#E9E9E9
| 0 ||  || MBA-M || 18.2 || data-sort-value="0.68" | 680 m || multiple || 1995–2020 || 07 Dec 2020 || 60 || align=left | Disc.: Spacewatch || 
|- id="1995 SX78" bgcolor=#E9E9E9
| 2 ||  || MBA-M || 17.86 || 1.1 km || multiple || 1995–2021 || 29 Oct 2021 || 30 || align=left | Disc.: SpacewatchAdded on 5 November 2021 || 
|- id="1995 SL79" bgcolor=#E9E9E9
| 0 ||  || MBA-M || 17.2 || 1.1 km || multiple || 1995–2021 || 04 Jan 2021 || 137 || align=left | Disc.: SpacewatchAlt.: 2010 BU73, 2015 PP134 || 
|- id="1995 SX80" bgcolor=#d6d6d6
| 0 ||  || MBA-O || 16.93 || 2.3 km || multiple || 1995–2021 || 08 Sep 2021 || 75 || align=left | Disc.: SpacewatchAdded on 21 August 2021 || 
|- id="1995 SH81" bgcolor=#d6d6d6
| 1 ||  || MBA-O || 18.57 || 1.1 km || multiple || 1995–2021 || 26 Oct 2021 || 42 || align=left | Disc.: SpacewatchAdded on 24 December 2021 || 
|- id="1995 SK81" bgcolor=#d6d6d6
| 0 ||  || MBA-O || 17.3 || 1.9 km || multiple || 1995–2020 || 02 Feb 2020 || 46 || align=left | Disc.: SpacewatchAdded on 22 July 2020 || 
|- id="1995 SP81" bgcolor=#E9E9E9
| 1 ||  || MBA-M || 18.0 || 1.4 km || multiple || 1995–2020 || 26 Jan 2020 || 35 || align=left | Disc.: SpacewatchAdded on 22 July 2020 || 
|- id="1995 SS81" bgcolor=#E9E9E9
| 1 ||  || MBA-M || 18.0 || data-sort-value="0.75" | 750 m || multiple || 1995–2020 || 17 Dec 2020 || 89 || align=left | Disc.: SpacewatchAdded on 17 January 2021Alt.: 2019 HL9 || 
|- id="1995 SV81" bgcolor=#d6d6d6
| 0 ||  || MBA-O || 17.6 || 1.7 km || multiple || 1995–2016 || 27 Aug 2016 || 27 || align=left | Disc.: Spacewatch || 
|- id="1995 SN82" bgcolor=#E9E9E9
| 0 ||  || MBA-M || 17.7 || 1.6 km || multiple || 1995–2020 || 26 Jan 2020 || 80 || align=left | Disc.: SpacewatchAlt.: 2011 CC115 || 
|- id="1995 ST82" bgcolor=#E9E9E9
| 0 ||  || MBA-M || 17.4 || 1.8 km || multiple || 1995–2021 || 15 Apr 2021 || 68 || align=left | Disc.: SpacewatchAdded on 17 June 2021Alt.: 2009 SX193 || 
|- id="1995 SE83" bgcolor=#d6d6d6
| 1 ||  || MBA-O || 17.70 || 1.6 km || multiple || 1995–2021 || 10 Oct 2021 || 60 || align=left | Disc.: SpacewatchAdded on 5 November 2021Alt.: 2016 SA96 || 
|- id="1995 SF83" bgcolor=#fefefe
| 0 ||  || MBA-I || 18.5 || data-sort-value="0.59" | 590 m || multiple || 1995–2020 || 06 Dec 2020 || 57 || align=left | Disc.: Spacewatch || 
|- id="1995 SM83" bgcolor=#fefefe
| 0 ||  || MBA-I || 18.5 || data-sort-value="0.59" | 590 m || multiple || 1995–2020 || 24 Jan 2020 || 77 || align=left | Disc.: SpacewatchAlt.: 2004 FY27 || 
|- id="1995 SN83" bgcolor=#fefefe
| 0 ||  || MBA-I || 19.5 || data-sort-value="0.37" | 370 m || multiple || 1995–2015 || 07 Jul 2015 || 26 || align=left | Disc.: SpacewatchAdded on 22 July 2020Alt.: 2001 FE240 || 
|- id="1995 SD84" bgcolor=#E9E9E9
| 0 ||  || MBA-M || 17.6 || data-sort-value="0.90" | 900 m || multiple || 1995–2021 || 09 Jan 2021 || 120 || align=left | Disc.: Spacewatch || 
|- id="1995 SE84" bgcolor=#fefefe
| 2 ||  || MBA-I || 19.12 || data-sort-value="0.39" | 450 m || multiple || 1995-2022 || 17 Sep 2022 || 40 || align=left | Disc.: Spacewatch Alt.: 2022 QK38 || 
|- id="1995 SA85" bgcolor=#d6d6d6
| 0 ||  || MBA-O || 17.8 || 1.5 km || multiple || 1995–2019 || 02 Nov 2019 || 75 || align=left | Disc.: SpacewatchAdded on 22 July 2020 || 
|- id="1995 SF85" bgcolor=#E9E9E9
| 0 ||  || MBA-M || 18.2 || data-sort-value="0.96" | 960 m || multiple || 1995–2021 || 29 Nov 2021 || 38 || align=left | Disc.: SpacewatchAdded on 29 January 2022 || 
|- id="1995 SK85" bgcolor=#fefefe
| 0 ||  || MBA-I || 18.9 || data-sort-value="0.49" | 490 m || multiple || 1995–2020 || 02 Feb 2020 || 55 || align=left | Disc.: SpacewatchAlt.: 2012 VR56 || 
|- id="1995 SZ85" bgcolor=#fefefe
| 0 ||  || MBA-I || 18.4 || data-sort-value="0.62" | 620 m || multiple || 1995–2020 || 11 Dec 2020 || 61 || align=left | Disc.: Spacewatch || 
|- id="1995 SF86" bgcolor=#E9E9E9
| 0 ||  || MBA-M || 18.00 || 1.1 km || multiple || 1995–2021 || 04 Oct 2021 || 67 || align=left | Disc.: SpacewatchAdded on 24 August 2020Alt.: 2012 PA30 || 
|- id="1995 SK86" bgcolor=#E9E9E9
| 0 ||  || MBA-M || 18.0 || data-sort-value="0.75" | 750 m || multiple || 1995–2020 || 14 Dec 2020 || 50 || align=left | Disc.: SpacewatchAdded on 22 July 2020Alt.: 2003 SW472 || 
|- id="1995 SQ86" bgcolor=#fefefe
| 0 ||  || MBA-I || 19.0 || data-sort-value="0.47" | 470 m || multiple || 1995–2020 || 15 Oct 2020 || 47 || align=left | Disc.: SpacewatchAdded on 17 January 2021 || 
|- id="1995 SK88" bgcolor=#E9E9E9
| 1 ||  || MBA-M || 18.11 || 1.0 km || multiple || 1995–2021 || 07 Oct 2021 || 61 || align=left | Disc.: Spacewatch || 
|- id="1995 SO88" bgcolor=#d6d6d6
| 1 ||  || MBA-O || 17.8 || 1.5 km || multiple || 1995–2018 || 06 Oct 2018 || 24 || align=left | Disc.: Spacewatch || 
|- id="1995 SC90" bgcolor=#d6d6d6
| 0 ||  || MBA-O || 17.62 || 1.7 km || multiple || 1995–2021 || 29 Oct 2021 || 36 || align=left | Disc.: SpacewatchAdded on 5 November 2021Alt.: 2021 TJ23 || 
|- id="1995 SJ90" bgcolor=#fefefe
| 0 ||  || MBA-I || 17.8 || data-sort-value="0.82" | 820 m || multiple || 1995–2021 || 17 Jan 2021 || 105 || align=left | Disc.: Spacewatch || 
|- id="1995 SN90" bgcolor=#fefefe
| 2 ||  || MBA-I || 19.91 || data-sort-value="0.31" | 310 m || multiple || 1995–2022 || 20 Sep 2022 || 34 || align=left | Disc.: Spacewatch || 
|- id="1995 SO90" bgcolor=#E9E9E9
| 0 ||  || MBA-M || 17.21 || 2.0 km || multiple || 1995–2021 || 03 May 2021 || 121 || align=left | Disc.: Spacewatch || 
|- id="1995 SP90" bgcolor=#E9E9E9
| 0 ||  || MBA-M || 16.92 || 1.7 km || multiple || 1995–2021 || 24 Oct 2021 || 201 || align=left | Disc.: Spacewatch || 
|- id="1995 SQ90" bgcolor=#fefefe
| 0 ||  || MBA-I || 17.7 || data-sort-value="0.86" | 860 m || multiple || 1995–2018 || 09 Nov 2018 || 86 || align=left | Disc.: Spacewatch || 
|- id="1995 SU90" bgcolor=#FA8072
| 0 ||  || MCA || 18.2 || data-sort-value="0.68" | 680 m || multiple || 1995–2020 || 17 Oct 2020 || 73 || align=left | Disc.: SpacewatchAdded on 17 January 2021 || 
|- id="1995 SV90" bgcolor=#FA8072
| 3 ||  || MCA || 20.2 || data-sort-value="0.27" | 270 m || multiple || 1995–2020 || 11 Nov 2020 || 36 || align=left | Disc.: SpacewatchAdded on 17 January 2021 || 
|- id="1995 SW90" bgcolor=#E9E9E9
| 1 ||  || MBA-M || 18.2 || data-sort-value="0.68" | 680 m || multiple || 1995–2020 || 16 Dec 2020 || 27 || align=left | Disc.: DB MissingAdded on 17 January 2021 || 
|- id="1995 SX90" bgcolor=#d6d6d6
| 0 ||  || MBA-O || 16.65 || 2.6 km || multiple || 1995–2021 || 08 Apr 2021 || 48 || align=left | Disc.: DB MissingAdded on 17 June 2021 || 
|- id="1995 SZ90" bgcolor=#d6d6d6
| 0 ||  || MBA-O || 16.87 || 2.4 km || multiple || 1995–2020 || 20 Jan 2020 || 64 || align=left | Disc.: SpacewatchAdded on 21 August 2021 || 
|- id="1995 SA91" bgcolor=#fefefe
| 4 ||  || MBA-I || 19.7 || data-sort-value="0.34" | 340 m || multiple || 1995–2021 || 04 Oct 2021 || 22 || align=left | Disc.: SpacewatchAdded on 5 November 2021 || 
|- id="1995 SB91" bgcolor=#fefefe
| 0 ||  || MBA-I || 18.8 || data-sort-value="0.52" | 520 m || multiple || 1995–2021 || 30 Nov 2021 || 81 || align=left | Disc.: SpacewatchAdded on 24 December 2021 || 
|- id="1995 SC91" bgcolor=#d6d6d6
| 2 ||  || MBA-O || 18.1 || 1.3 km || multiple || 1995–2021 || 30 Nov 2021 || 30 || align=left | Disc.: SpacewatchAdded on 24 December 2021 || 
|}
back to top

T 

|- id="1995 TJ1" bgcolor=#E9E9E9
| – ||  || MBA-M || 18.0 || data-sort-value="0.75" | 750 m || single || 14 days || 28 Oct 1995 ||  || align=left | Disc.: Xinglong Stn. || 
|- id="1995 TB4" bgcolor=#E9E9E9
| 0 ||  || MBA-M || 18.1 || data-sort-value="0.71" | 710 m || multiple || 1995–2020 || 23 Sep 2020 || 43 || align=left | Disc.: SpacewatchAdded on 17 January 2021 || 
|- id="1995 TH4" bgcolor=#E9E9E9
| 0 ||  || MBA-M || 17.95 || 1.1 km || multiple || 1995–2021 || 24 Oct 2021 || 61 || align=left | Disc.: SpacewatchAlt.: 2017 UL83 || 
|- id="1995 TZ4" bgcolor=#E9E9E9
| 0 ||  || MBA-M || 18.8 || data-sort-value="0.52" | 520 m || multiple || 1995–2020 || 05 Nov 2020 || 72 || align=left | Disc.: Spacewatch || 
|- id="1995 TC5" bgcolor=#E9E9E9
| 1 ||  || MBA-M || 19.0 || data-sort-value="0.47" | 470 m || multiple || 1995–2020 || 14 Nov 2020 || 36 || align=left | Disc.: Spacewatch || 
|- id="1995 TB6" bgcolor=#d6d6d6
| 0 ||  || MBA-O || 17.53 || 1.7 km || multiple || 1995–2021 || 07 Nov 2021 || 65 || align=left | Disc.: SpacewatchAlt.: 2011 WC32 || 
|- id="1995 TR7" bgcolor=#E9E9E9
| 0 ||  || MBA-M || 17.0 || 1.2 km || multiple || 1995–2020 || 22 Nov 2020 || 57 || align=left | Disc.: SpacewatchAdded on 17 January 2021 || 
|- id="1995 TQ8" bgcolor=#d6d6d6
| 0 ||  || MBA-O || 16.5 || 2.8 km || multiple || 1995–2020 || 24 Mar 2020 || 96 || align=left | Disc.: Spacewatch || 
|- id="1995 TA9" bgcolor=#fefefe
| 0 ||  || MBA-I || 18.4 || data-sort-value="0.62" | 620 m || multiple || 1995–2021 || 06 Jan 2021 || 70 || align=left | Disc.: SpacewatchAdded on 17 January 2021Alt.: 2011 BO74 || 
|- id="1995 TB9" bgcolor=#d6d6d6
| 2 ||  || MBA-O || 17.6 || 1.7 km || multiple || 1995–2021 || 28 Nov 2021 || 43 || align=left | Disc.: SpacewatchAdded on 24 December 2021 || 
|- id="1995 TL9" bgcolor=#d6d6d6
| 0 ||  || MBA-O || 17.9 || 1.5 km || multiple || 1995–2020 || 24 Dec 2020 || 29 || align=left | Disc.: SpacewatchAdded on 22 July 2020 || 
|- id="1995 TD10" bgcolor=#E9E9E9
| 0 ||  || MBA-M || 17.73 || data-sort-value="0.85" | 850 m || multiple || 1995–2020 || 17 Nov 2020 || 57 || align=left | Disc.: SpacewatchAdded on 17 January 2021 || 
|- id="1995 TC11" bgcolor=#fefefe
| 0 ||  || HUN || 19.28 || data-sort-value="0.41" | 410 m || multiple || 1995–2019 || 14 Jan 2019 || 27 || align=left | Disc.: Spacewatch || 
|- id="1995 TH11" bgcolor=#d6d6d6
| 1 ||  || MBA-O || 18.0 || 1.4 km || multiple || 1995–2017 || 15 Nov 2017 || 32 || align=left | Disc.: Spacewatch || 
|- id="1995 TM11" bgcolor=#fefefe
| 2 ||  || MBA-I || 19.2 || data-sort-value="0.43" | 430 m || multiple || 1995–2020 || 09 Sep 2020 || 42 || align=left | Disc.: Spacewatch || 
|- id="1995 TN11" bgcolor=#d6d6d6
| 0 ||  || MBA-O || 17.09 || 2.1 km || multiple || 1995–2021 || 26 Nov 2021 || 121 || align=left | Disc.: SpacewatchAlt.: 2015 PS188 || 
|- id="1995 TO11" bgcolor=#fefefe
| 1 ||  || MBA-I || 18.5 || data-sort-value="0.54" | 700 m || multiple || 1995-2021 || 22 Sep 2021 || 28 || align=left | Disc.: Spacewatch Alt.:2010 UU134 || 
|- id="1995 TQ11" bgcolor=#E9E9E9
| 0 ||  || MBA-M || 17.7 || 1.2 km || multiple || 1995–2021 || 27 Oct 2021 || 55 || align=left | Disc.: SpacewatchAdded on 29 January 2022 || 
|- id="1995 TS11" bgcolor=#E9E9E9
| 0 ||  || MBA-M || 17.78 || 1.5 km || multiple || 1995–2021 || 08 May 2021 || 66 || align=left | Disc.: SpacewatchAdded on 11 May 2021Alt.: 2016 EP285 || 
|- id="1995 TX12" bgcolor=#fefefe
| 0 ||  || MBA-I || 18.0 || data-sort-value="0.75" | 750 m || multiple || 1995–2019 || 24 Sep 2019 || 61 || align=left | Disc.: Spacewatch || 
|- id="1995 TZ12" bgcolor=#d6d6d6
| 0 ||  || MBA-O || 16.8 || 2.4 km || multiple || 1995–2020 || 21 Apr 2020 || 53 || align=left | Disc.: SpacewatchAdded on 17 January 2021 || 
|- id="1995 TA13" bgcolor=#d6d6d6
| 0 ||  || MBA-O || 17.53 || 1.7 km || multiple || 1995–2021 || 25 Nov 2021 || 54 || align=left | Disc.: SpacewatchAdded on 5 November 2021 || 
|}
back to top

U 

|- id="1995 UB" bgcolor=#FFC2E0
| 7 || 1995 UB || APO || 27.3 || data-sort-value="0.012" | 12 m || single || 8 days || 26 Oct 1995 || 24 || align=left | Disc.: Spacewatch || 
|- id="1995 UC2" bgcolor=#FFC2E0
| 0 ||  || AMO || 20.89 || data-sort-value="0.19" | 200 m || multiple || 1995-2021 || 23 Nov 2021 || 53 || align=left | Disc.: Spacewatch Alt.: 2021 RV16 || 
|- id="1995 UQ10" bgcolor=#E9E9E9
| 1 ||  || MBA-M || 17.88 || data-sort-value="0.79" | 790 m || multiple || 1995–2021 || 05 Mar 2021 || 47 || align=left | Disc.: SpacewatchAdded on 11 May 2021Alt.: 2020 VW9 || 
|- id="1995 UV12" bgcolor=#fefefe
| 0 ||  || MBA-I || 19.06 || data-sort-value="0.46" | 460 m || multiple || 1995–2022 || 05 Jan 2022 || 39 || align=left | Disc.: SpacewatchAlt.: 2006 UO257 || 
|- id="1995 UD17" bgcolor=#fefefe
| 0 ||  || MBA-I || 18.36 || data-sort-value="0.63" | 630 m || multiple || 1991–2021 || 28 Sep 2021 || 89 || align=left | Disc.: Spacewatch || 
|- id="1995 UK19" bgcolor=#d6d6d6
| 0 ||  || MBA-O || 17.5 || 1.8 km || multiple || 1995–2021 || 14 Jun 2021 || 37 || align=left | Disc.: Spacewatch || 
|- id="1995 UW19" bgcolor=#fefefe
| 2 ||  || MBA-I || 18.5 || data-sort-value="0.59" | 590 m || multiple || 1995–2018 || 02 Nov 2018 || 61 || align=left | Disc.: SpacewatchAlt.: 2014 QZ478 || 
|- id="1995 UZ19" bgcolor=#E9E9E9
| 0 ||  || MBA-M || 17.7 || 1.6 km || multiple || 1995–2016 || 01 Apr 2016 || 52 || align=left | Disc.: SpacewatchAlt.: 2004 TS27 || 
|- id="1995 UG20" bgcolor=#d6d6d6
| 3 ||  || MBA-O || 17.2 || 2.0 km || multiple || 1995–2018 || 10 Nov 2018 || 41 || align=left | Disc.: SpacewatchAlt.: 2018 VN24 || 
|- id="1995 UO20" bgcolor=#E9E9E9
| 0 ||  || MBA-M || 17.3 || 1.0 km || multiple || 1995–2021 || 16 Jan 2021 || 99 || align=left | Disc.: SpacewatchAlt.: 2014 HO141 || 
|- id="1995 UU21" bgcolor=#E9E9E9
| 2 ||  || MBA-M || 18.64 || data-sort-value="0.59" | 560 m || multiple || 1995-2020 || 11 Dec 2020 || 24 || align=left | Disc.: Spacewatch || 
|- id="1995 UW22" bgcolor=#E9E9E9
| 0 ||  || MBA-M || 18.54 || data-sort-value="0.82" | 820 m || multiple || 1995–2022 || 27 Jan 2022 || 40 || align=left | Disc.: Spacewatch || 
|- id="1995 UU25" bgcolor=#fefefe
| 0 ||  || MBA-I || 17.98 || data-sort-value="0.75" | 750 m || multiple || 1995–2021 || 08 May 2021 || 48 || align=left | Disc.: SpacewatchAdded on 22 July 2020 || 
|- id="1995 UU26" bgcolor=#E9E9E9
| 0 ||  || MBA-M || 17.49 || 1.3 km || multiple || 1995–2021 || 31 Aug 2021 || 134 || align=left | Disc.: Spacewatch || 
|- id="1995 UW27" bgcolor=#E9E9E9
| 0 ||  || MBA-M || 18.1 || data-sort-value="0.71" | 710 m || multiple || 1995–2020 || 08 Dec 2020 || 61 || align=left | Disc.: SpacewatchAdded on 17 January 2021 || 
|- id="1995 UO28" bgcolor=#E9E9E9
| 0 ||  || MBA-M || 17.98 || 1.1 km || multiple || 1995–2021 || 06 Nov 2021 || 75 || align=left | Disc.: SpacewatchAdded on 30 September 2021Alt.: 2017 UK152 || 
|- id="1995 UA29" bgcolor=#E9E9E9
| 0 ||  || MBA-M || 17.42 || 1.4 km || multiple || 1995–2021 || 27 Sep 2021 || 135 || align=left | Disc.: SpacewatchAlt.: 2006 BG254 || 
|- id="1995 UG30" bgcolor=#E9E9E9
| 0 ||  || MBA-M || 17.6 || 1.3 km || multiple || 1995–2021 || 03 Dec 2021 || 77 || align=left | Disc.: SpacewatchAdded on 5 November 2021 || 
|- id="1995 UJ30" bgcolor=#E9E9E9
| 0 ||  || MBA-M || 17.2 || 2.0 km || multiple || 1995–2020 || 24 Mar 2020 || 58 || align=left | Disc.: Spacewatch || 
|- id="1995 UP30" bgcolor=#FA8072
| 0 ||  || MCA || 18.7 || data-sort-value="0.54" | 540 m || multiple || 1995–2020 || 24 Jun 2020 || 54 || align=left | Disc.: Spacewatch || 
|- id="1995 UP33" bgcolor=#E9E9E9
| 0 ||  || MBA-M || 18.17 || data-sort-value="0.69" | 690 m || multiple || 1995–2020 || 14 Dec 2020 || 39 || align=left | Disc.: SpacewatchAdded on 17 January 2021 || 
|- id="1995 US33" bgcolor=#E9E9E9
| 0 ||  || MBA-M || 18.02 || 1.0 km || multiple || 1995–2021 || 02 Oct 2021 || 62 || align=left | Disc.: SpacewatchAdded on 21 August 2021Alt.: 2008 RY22 || 
|- id="1995 UT33" bgcolor=#E9E9E9
| 0 ||  || MBA-M || 17.89 || 1.1 km || multiple || 1995–2021 || 27 Sep 2021 || 107 || align=left | Disc.: Spacewatch || 
|- id="1995 UA35" bgcolor=#fefefe
| 1 ||  || MBA-I || 19.1 || data-sort-value="0.45" | 450 m || multiple || 1995–2016 || 25 Oct 2016 || 30 || align=left | Disc.: SpacewatchAdded on 17 June 2021Alt.: 2002 TR337 || 
|- id="1995 UL35" bgcolor=#d6d6d6
| 0 ||  || MBA-O || 18.00 || 1.4 km || multiple || 1995–2021 || 24 Oct 2021 || 80 || align=left | Disc.: Spacewatch || 
|- id="1995 UR36" bgcolor=#fefefe
| 0 ||  || MBA-I || 18.9 || data-sort-value="0.49" | 490 m || multiple || 1995–2020 || 08 Dec 2020 || 72 || align=left | Disc.: SpacewatchAdded on 17 January 2021 || 
|- id="1995 UP38" bgcolor=#d6d6d6
| 0 ||  || MBA-O || 16.78 || 2.5 km || multiple || 1995–2021 || 03 Oct 2021 || 134 || align=left | Disc.: SpacewatchAlt.: 2014 HZ141 || 
|- id="1995 UQ38" bgcolor=#E9E9E9
| 0 ||  || MBA-M || 17.72 || 1.6 km || multiple || 1995–2021 || 07 Apr 2021 || 132 || align=left | Disc.: SpacewatchAlt.: 2011 BW160, 2014 WZ207 || 
|- id="1995 US38" bgcolor=#d6d6d6
| – ||  || MBA-O || 18.4 || 1.2 km || single || 13 days || 28 Oct 1995 || 9 || align=left | Disc.: Spacewatch || 
|- id="1995 UT38" bgcolor=#fefefe
| 2 ||  || MBA-I || 19.5 || data-sort-value="0.37" | 370 m || multiple || 1995–2021 || 28 Nov 2021 || 34 || align=left | Disc.: SpacewatchAdded on 29 January 2022 || 
|- id="1995 UB41" bgcolor=#fefefe
| 0 ||  || MBA-I || 18.0 || data-sort-value="0.75" | 750 m || multiple || 1995–2020 || 05 Nov 2020 || 118 || align=left | Disc.: Spacewatch || 
|- id="1995 US41" bgcolor=#fefefe
| E ||  || MBA-I || 18.5 || data-sort-value="0.59" | 590 m || single || 5 days || 28 Oct 1995 || 9 || align=left | Disc.: Spacewatch || 
|- id="1995 UL42" bgcolor=#d6d6d6
| 0 ||  || MBA-O || 17.0 || 2.2 km || multiple || 1995–2021 || 04 Jan 2021 || 136 || align=left | Disc.: SpacewatchAlt.: 2014 RL53 || 
|- id="1995 UO43" bgcolor=#fefefe
| 1 ||  || MBA-I || 18.6 || data-sort-value="0.57" | 570 m || multiple || 1995–2020 || 17 Dec 2020 || 51 || align=left | Disc.: SpacewatchAdded on 11 May 2021Alt.: 2013 VR60 || 
|- id="1995 UJ44" bgcolor=#E9E9E9
| 0 ||  || MBA-M || 17.1 || 1.1 km || multiple || 1995–2020 || 07 Dec 2020 || 91 || align=left | Disc.: Spacewatch || 
|- id="1995 UB50" bgcolor=#E9E9E9
| 2 ||  || MBA-M || 18.5 || data-sort-value="0.59" | 590 m || multiple || 1995–2021 || 16 Jan 2021 || 52 || align=left | Disc.: SpacewatchAdded on 17 January 2021 || 
|- id="1995 UE50" bgcolor=#fefefe
| 3 ||  || MBA-I || 19.2 || data-sort-value="0.43" | 430 m || multiple || 1995–2015 || 02 Nov 2015 || 34 || align=left | Disc.: SpacewatchAdded on 17 January 2021Alt.: 2015 VZ13 || 
|- id="1995 UH50" bgcolor=#fefefe
| 0 ||  || MBA-I || 19.2 || data-sort-value="0.43" | 430 m || multiple || 1995–2015 || 08 Oct 2015 || 49 || align=left | Disc.: SpacewatchAlt.: 2015 RY6 || 
|- id="1995 UC51" bgcolor=#fefefe
| 0 ||  || MBA-I || 18.7 || data-sort-value="0.54" | 540 m || multiple || 1995–2021 || 16 Jan 2021 || 61 || align=left | Disc.: SpacewatchAdded on 17 January 2021 || 
|- id="1995 UC52" bgcolor=#fefefe
| 0 ||  || MBA-I || 17.70 || data-sort-value="0.86" | 860 m || multiple || 1995–2021 || 24 Nov 2021 || 112 || align=left | Disc.: SpacewatchAlt.: 2010 PH86 || 
|- id="1995 UT53" bgcolor=#d6d6d6
| 0 ||  || MBA-O || 16.9 || 2.3 km || multiple || 1995–2020 || 20 Feb 2020 || 50 || align=left | Disc.: Spacewatch || 
|- id="1995 UV53" bgcolor=#d6d6d6
| – ||  || MBA-O || 17.6 || 1.7 km || single || 12 days || 27 Oct 1995 || 9 || align=left | Disc.: Spacewatch || 
|- id="1995 US54" bgcolor=#fefefe
| 0 ||  || MBA-I || 19.37 || data-sort-value="0.40" | 400 m || multiple || 1995–2021 || 26 Nov 2021 || 51 || align=left | Disc.: SpacewatchAdded on 24 December 2021 || 
|- id="1995 UT56" bgcolor=#E9E9E9
| 0 ||  || MBA-M || 17.2 || 1.1 km || multiple || 1995–2021 || 08 Jan 2021 || 169 || align=left | Disc.: SpacewatchAlt.: 2005 BF39, 2007 RT99 || 
|- id="1995 UM57" bgcolor=#E9E9E9
| 2 ||  || MBA-M || 18.34 || data-sort-value="0.64" | 640 m || multiple || 1995–2020 || 11 Dec 2020 || 42 || align=left | Disc.: SpacewatchAdded on 9 March 2021 || 
|- id="1995 UJ58" bgcolor=#fefefe
| – ||  || MBA-I || 19.3 || data-sort-value="0.41" | 410 m || single || 11 days || 28 Oct 1995 || 9 || align=left | Disc.: Spacewatch || 
|- id="1995 UJ59" bgcolor=#fefefe
| 0 ||  || MBA-I || 17.9 || data-sort-value="0.78" | 780 m || multiple || 1995–2020 || 17 Dec 2020 || 61 || align=left | Disc.: SpacewatchAdded on 17 January 2021Alt.: 2016 TH100 || 
|- id="1995 UM59" bgcolor=#FA8072
| 1 ||  || MCA || 19.3 || data-sort-value="0.58" | 580 m || multiple || 1995–2012 || 17 Nov 2012 || 31 || align=left | Disc.: Spacewatch || 
|- id="1995 UP59" bgcolor=#E9E9E9
| 0 ||  || MBA-M || 18.06 || 1.4 km || multiple || 1995–2021 || 09 Jul 2021 || 46 || align=left | Disc.: SpacewatchAlt.: 2017 RV4 || 
|- id="1995 UW60" bgcolor=#d6d6d6
| 0 ||  || MBA-O || 17.81 || 1.5 km || multiple || 1995–2021 || 30 Nov 2021 || 38 || align=left | Disc.: SpacewatchAdded on 29 January 2022 || 
|- id="1995 UY60" bgcolor=#E9E9E9
| 0 ||  || MBA-M || 17.4 || data-sort-value="0.98" | 980 m || multiple || 1995–2020 || 20 Dec 2020 || 84 || align=left | Disc.: Spacewatch || 
|- id="1995 UR61" bgcolor=#E9E9E9
| 0 ||  || MBA-M || 17.53 || 1.7 km || multiple || 1995–2021 || 12 May 2021 || 73 || align=left | Disc.: SpacewatchAdded on 22 July 2020 || 
|- id="1995 UF62" bgcolor=#E9E9E9
| 0 ||  || MBA-M || 18.0 || data-sort-value="0.75" | 750 m || multiple || 1995–2020 || 08 Dec 2020 || 75 || align=left | Disc.: SpacewatchAdded on 17 January 2021 || 
|- id="1995 UG62" bgcolor=#E9E9E9
| 2 ||  || MBA-M || 18.4 || data-sort-value="0.62" | 620 m || multiple || 1995–2020 || 14 Dec 2020 || 128 || align=left | Disc.: Spacewatch || 
|- id="1995 UX62" bgcolor=#E9E9E9
| 0 ||  || MBA-M || 17.57 || 1.7 km || multiple || 1995–2021 || 08 May 2021 || 69 || align=left | Disc.: SpacewatchAlt.: 2010 BH112 || 
|- id="1995 UE63" bgcolor=#fefefe
| 2 ||  || MBA-I || 18.9 || data-sort-value="0.49" | 490 m || multiple || 1995–2017 || 07 Dec 2017 || 39 || align=left | Disc.: Spacewatch || 
|- id="1995 UU63" bgcolor=#fefefe
| 0 ||  || MBA-I || 18.4 || data-sort-value="0.62" | 620 m || multiple || 1995–2019 || 21 Dec 2019 || 101 || align=left | Disc.: SpacewatchAlt.: 1995 OR18 || 
|- id="1995 UD66" bgcolor=#E9E9E9
| 0 ||  || MBA-M || 17.79 || 1.2 km || multiple || 1995–2022 || 27 Jan 2022 || 200 || align=left | Disc.: Spacewatch || 
|- id="1995 UJ67" bgcolor=#fefefe
| 0 ||  || MBA-I || 18.48 || data-sort-value="0.60" | 600 m || multiple || 1995–2021 || 11 Sep 2021 || 94 || align=left | Disc.: Spacewatch || 
|- id="1995 UM67" bgcolor=#fefefe
| 1 ||  || MBA-I || 18.4 || data-sort-value="0.62" | 620 m || multiple || 1995–2020 || 14 Nov 2020 || 71 || align=left | Disc.: SpacewatchAlt.: 2019 GW70 || 
|- id="1995 UN67" bgcolor=#fefefe
| 0 ||  || MBA-I || 19.49 || data-sort-value="0.38" | 380 m || multiple || 1995–2021 || 15 Aug 2021 || 49 || align=left | Disc.: SpacewatchAdded on 17 June 2021Alt.: 2005 UY542 || 
|- id="1995 UO67" bgcolor=#d6d6d6
| 0 ||  || MBA-O || 17.06 || 2.2 km || multiple || 1995–2021 || 29 Nov 2021 || 98 || align=left | Disc.: SpacewatchAlt.: 2015 TN337 || 
|- id="1995 UW67" bgcolor=#E9E9E9
| 0 ||  || MBA-M || 17.48 || 1.3 km || multiple || 1995–2021 || 27 Oct 2021 || 126 || align=left | Disc.: SpacewatchAdded on 13 September 2020Alt.: 2020 HX15 || 
|- id="1995 UH68" bgcolor=#d6d6d6
| 0 ||  || MBA-O || 16.6 || 2.7 km || multiple || 1995–2021 || 15 Mar 2021 || 44 || align=left | Disc.: SpacewatchAdded on 21 August 2021 || 
|- id="1995 UW68" bgcolor=#fefefe
| 0 ||  || MBA-I || 19.4 || data-sort-value="0.39" | 390 m || multiple || 1995–2021 || 07 Oct 2021 || 36 || align=left | Disc.: SpacewatchAdded on 29 January 2022 || 
|- id="1995 UZ68" bgcolor=#fefefe
| 0 ||  || MBA-I || 19.30 || data-sort-value="0.41" | 410 m || multiple || 1995–2021 || 12 Aug 2021 || 58 || align=left | Disc.: SpacewatchAdded on 22 July 2020 || 
|- id="1995 UA69" bgcolor=#fefefe
| 0 ||  || MBA-I || 18.05 || data-sort-value="0.73" | 730 m || multiple || 1995–2021 || 29 Nov 2021 || 108 || align=left | Disc.: Spacewatch || 
|- id="1995 UF69" bgcolor=#E9E9E9
| 0 ||  || MBA-M || 17.55 || 1.3 km || multiple || 1995–2021 || 30 Oct 2021 || 106 || align=left | Disc.: Spacewatch || 
|- id="1995 UJ69" bgcolor=#FA8072
| 0 ||  || MCA || 18.9 || data-sort-value="0.49" | 490 m || multiple || 1995–2020 || 10 Sep 2020 || 95 || align=left | Disc.: Spacewatch || 
|- id="1995 UK69" bgcolor=#fefefe
| 0 ||  || MBA-I || 18.5 || data-sort-value="0.59" | 590 m || multiple || 1995–2020 || 20 Oct 2020 || 159 || align=left | Disc.: SpacewatchAdded on 17 January 2021 || 
|- id="1995 UO69" bgcolor=#d6d6d6
| 0 ||  || MBA-O || 18.12 || 1.3 km || multiple || 1995–2021 || 31 Oct 2021 || 49 || align=left | Disc.: SpacewatchAdded on 5 November 2021Alt.: 2016 TG178 || 
|- id="1995 UH70" bgcolor=#E9E9E9
| 2 ||  || MBA-M || 18.91 || data-sort-value="0.49" | 490 m || multiple || 1995–2019 || 18 Sep 2019 || 36 || align=left | Disc.: SpacewatchAdded on 5 November 2021 || 
|- id="1995 UO70" bgcolor=#E9E9E9
| 0 ||  || MBA-M || 17.63 || 1.7 km || multiple || 1995–2021 || 10 Apr 2021 || 103 || align=left | Disc.: Spacewatch || 
|- id="1995 UP70" bgcolor=#d6d6d6
| 0 ||  || MBA-O || 16.5 || 2.8 km || multiple || 1995–2018 || 13 Nov 2018 || 67 || align=left | Disc.: Spacewatch || 
|- id="1995 UZ70" bgcolor=#d6d6d6
| 1 ||  || MBA-O || 18.0 || 1.4 km || multiple || 1995–2021 || 01 Nov 2021 || 34 || align=left | Disc.: SpacewatchAdded on 29 January 2022 || 
|- id="1995 UE71" bgcolor=#d6d6d6
| 1 ||  || MBA-O || 17.0 || 2.2 km || multiple || 1995–2020 || 23 Jan 2020 || 53 || align=left | Disc.: Spacewatch || 
|- id="1995 UF72" bgcolor=#d6d6d6
| 2 ||  || MBA-O || 18.11 || 1.3 km || multiple || 1995–2021 || 08 Sep 2021 || 36 || align=left | Disc.: Spacewatch || 
|- id="1995 UT72" bgcolor=#E9E9E9
| 0 ||  || MBA-M || 17.84 || 1.1 km || multiple || 1995–2021 || 06 Nov 2021 || 76 || align=left | Disc.: SpacewatchAdded on 22 July 2020 || 
|- id="1995 UW72" bgcolor=#d6d6d6
| 0 ||  || MBA-O || 17.25 || 2.0 km || multiple || 1995–2021 || 10 Sep 2021 || 64 || align=left | Disc.: Spacewatch || 
|- id="1995 UJ74" bgcolor=#d6d6d6
| 2 ||  || MBA-O || 18.2 || 1.3 km || multiple || 1995–2017 || 13 Nov 2017 || 33 || align=left | Disc.: Spacewatch || 
|- id="1995 UT74" bgcolor=#fefefe
| 0 ||  || MBA-I || 18.5 || data-sort-value="0.59" | 590 m || multiple || 1995–2020 || 13 Sep 2020 || 44 || align=left | Disc.: SpacewatchAdded on 19 October 2020 || 
|- id="1995 UG75" bgcolor=#fefefe
| 0 ||  || MBA-I || 18.5 || data-sort-value="0.59" | 590 m || multiple || 1995–2019 || 10 Jan 2019 || 55 || align=left | Disc.: Spacewatch || 
|- id="1995 UL75" bgcolor=#d6d6d6
| 2 ||  || MBA-O || 17.25 || 2.0 km || multiple || 1995–2021 || 07 Jan 2021 || 28 || align=left | Disc.: SpacewatchAdded on 11 May 2021Alt.: 2020 WR14 || 
|- id="1995 UB76" bgcolor=#fefefe
| 0 ||  || MBA-I || 18.9 || data-sort-value="0.49" | 490 m || multiple || 1995–2021 || 18 Jan 2021 || 39 || align=left | Disc.: SpacewatchAdded on 11 May 2021Alt.: 2016 TT63 || 
|- id="1995 UE76" bgcolor=#E9E9E9
| 3 ||  || MBA-M || 18.4 || data-sort-value="0.62" | 620 m || multiple || 1995–2020 || 11 Dec 2020 || 35 || align=left | Disc.: SpacewatchAdded on 17 January 2021 || 
|- id="1995 UG76" bgcolor=#fefefe
| 0 ||  || MBA-I || 18.59 || data-sort-value="0.57" | 570 m || multiple || 1995–2021 || 11 Jun 2021 || 51 || align=left | Disc.: SpacewatchAlt.: 2015 UL23 || 
|- id="1995 UN76" bgcolor=#d6d6d6
| 0 ||  || MBA-O || 17.77 || 1.6 km || multiple || 1995–2021 || 01 Apr 2021 || 100 || align=left | Disc.: SpacewatchAdded on 22 July 2020 || 
|- id="1995 UP76" bgcolor=#fefefe
| 0 ||  || MBA-I || 18.40 || data-sort-value="0.62" | 620 m || multiple || 1995–2021 || 11 Oct 2021 || 58 || align=left | Disc.: SpacewatchAdded on 30 September 2021Alt.: 2010 VF66, 2010 VX223 || 
|- id="1995 UO77" bgcolor=#d6d6d6
| 2 ||  || MBA-O || 17.7 || 1.6 km || multiple || 1995–2020 || 15 Oct 2020 || 49 || align=left | Disc.: SpacewatchAdded on 19 October 2020 || 
|- id="1995 UQ77" bgcolor=#d6d6d6
| 0 ||  || MBA-O || 17.2 || 2.0 km || multiple || 1995–2021 || 06 Oct 2021 || 44 || align=left | Disc.: SpacewatchAdded on 5 November 2021 || 
|- id="1995 UB78" bgcolor=#fefefe
| 0 ||  || MBA-I || 17.83 || data-sort-value="0.81" | 810 m || multiple || 1995–2021 || 13 May 2021 || 128 || align=left | Disc.: Spacewatch || 
|- id="1995 UX78" bgcolor=#d6d6d6
| 0 ||  || MBA-O || 16.9 || 2.3 km || multiple || 1995–2020 || 13 May 2020 || 44 || align=left | Disc.: Spacewatch || 
|- id="1995 UA79" bgcolor=#E9E9E9
| 0 ||  || MBA-M || 17.18 || 1.1 km || multiple || 1995–2022 || 08 Jan 2022 || 148 || align=left | Disc.: SpacewatchAlt.: 2010 FW21 || 
|- id="1995 UO79" bgcolor=#d6d6d6
| 0 ||  || MBA-O || 16.93 || 2.3 km || multiple || 1995–2021 || 10 Sep 2021 || 100 || align=left | Disc.: SpacewatchAlt.: 2015 KA29 || 
|- id="1995 US79" bgcolor=#E9E9E9
| 0 ||  || MBA-M || 18.0 || 1.1 km || multiple || 1995–2020 || 17 Oct 2020 || 70 || align=left | Disc.: SpacewatchAdded on 17 January 2021Alt.: 2015 HF135 || 
|- id="1995 UX79" bgcolor=#fefefe
| 1 ||  || MBA-I || 19.2 || data-sort-value="0.43" | 430 m || multiple || 1995–2020 || 23 Nov 2020 || 41 || align=left | Disc.: SpacewatchAdded on 17 January 2021 || 
|- id="1995 UO80" bgcolor=#E9E9E9
| 0 ||  || MBA-M || 18.15 || data-sort-value="0.99" | 990 m || multiple || 1995–2021 || 02 Dec 2021 || 28 || align=left | Disc.: Spacewatch || 
|- id="1995 UZ80" bgcolor=#E9E9E9
| 0 ||  || MBA-M || 17.19 || 1.5 km || multiple || 1993–2021 || 30 Nov 2021 || 168 || align=left | Disc.: Spacewatch || 
|- id="1995 UX81" bgcolor=#fefefe
| 0 ||  || MBA-I || 18.0 || data-sort-value="0.75" | 750 m || multiple || 1995–2020 || 17 Dec 2020 || 137 || align=left | Disc.: SpacewatchAdded on 17 June 2021Alt.: 2006 WG55 || 
|- id="1995 UC84" bgcolor=#d6d6d6
| 0 ||  || MBA-O || 16.73 || 2.5 km || multiple || 1995–2021 || 30 Nov 2021 || 149 || align=left | Disc.: Spacewatch || 
|- id="1995 UD84" bgcolor=#E9E9E9
| 0 ||  || MBA-M || 17.1 || 2.1 km || multiple || 1995–2021 || 16 Jan 2021 || 85 || align=left | Disc.: Spacewatch || 
|- id="1995 UE84" bgcolor=#d6d6d6
| 0 ||  || MBA-O || 17.15 || 2.1 km || multiple || 1995–2021 || 04 Oct 2021 || 59 || align=left | Disc.: Spacewatch || 
|- id="1995 UF84" bgcolor=#d6d6d6
| 0 ||  || MBA-O || 16.9 || 2.3 km || multiple || 1995–2019 || 07 Jan 2019 || 46 || align=left | Disc.: SpacewatchAdded on 22 July 2020 || 
|- id="1995 UG84" bgcolor=#fefefe
| 0 ||  || MBA-I || 18.7 || data-sort-value="0.54" | 540 m || multiple || 1995–2020 || 05 Nov 2020 || 77 || align=left | Disc.: SpacewatchAdded on 22 July 2020 || 
|- id="1995 UH84" bgcolor=#E9E9E9
| 0 ||  || MBA-M || 17.87 || 1.5 km || multiple || 1995–2021 || 06 Aug 2021 || 58 || align=left | Disc.: SpacewatchAdded on 22 July 2020 || 
|- id="1995 UJ84" bgcolor=#E9E9E9
| 0 ||  || MBA-M || 17.53 || data-sort-value="0.93" | 930 m || multiple || 1995–2020 || 20 Dec 2020 || 108 || align=left | Disc.: SpacewatchAdded on 13 September 2020 || 
|- id="1995 UK84" bgcolor=#fefefe
| 0 ||  || MBA-I || 19.2 || data-sort-value="0.43" | 430 m || multiple || 1995–2020 || 17 Oct 2020 || 65 || align=left | Disc.: SpacewatchAdded on 11 May 2021Alt.: 1995 UM68 || 
|- id="1995 UN84" bgcolor=#d6d6d6
| 2 ||  || MBA-O || 17.5 || 1.8 km || multiple || 1995–2020 || 15 Oct 2020 || 28 || align=left | Disc.: No observationsAdded on 9 March 2021 || 
|}
back to top

V 

|- id="1995 VG3" bgcolor=#E9E9E9
| 0 ||  || MBA-M || 17.26 || 1.5 km || multiple || 1995–2021 || 30 Nov 2021 || 126 || align=left | Disc.: SpacewatchAlt.: 2015 MC23 || 
|- id="1995 VH3" bgcolor=#fefefe
| 0 ||  || MBA-I || 18.2 || data-sort-value="0.68" | 680 m || multiple || 1995–2019 || 27 Oct 2019 || 87 || align=left | Disc.: Spacewatch || 
|- id="1995 VY3" bgcolor=#E9E9E9
| 0 ||  || MBA-M || 18.12 || 1.0 km || multiple || 1995–2021 || 09 Dec 2021 || 71 || align=left | Disc.: SpacewatchAlt.: 2021 RD103 || 
|- id="1995 VC5" bgcolor=#E9E9E9
| 0 ||  || MBA-M || 18.13 || data-sort-value="0.99" | 990 m || multiple || 1995–2022 || 06 Jan 2022 || 72 || align=left | Disc.: Spacewatch || 
|- id="1995 VW5" bgcolor=#E9E9E9
| 1 ||  || MBA-M || 19.25 || 420 m || multiple || 1995-2020|| 14 Nov 2020 || 40 || align=left | Disc.: Spacewatch Alt.: 2020 TR49 || 
|- id="1995 VA6" bgcolor=#E9E9E9
| 0 ||  || MBA-M || 17.6 || 1.7 km || multiple || 1995–2020 || 27 Jan 2020 || 40 || align=left | Disc.: Spacewatch || 
|- id="1995 VC6" bgcolor=#E9E9E9
| 0 ||  || MBA-M || 17.52 || 1.7 km || multiple || 1995–2021 || 11 Jun 2021 || 55 || align=left | Disc.: SpacewatchAdded on 22 July 2020Alt.: 2016 GD87 || 
|- id="1995 VG6" bgcolor=#d6d6d6
| 0 ||  || MBA-O || 17.38 || 1.9 km || multiple || 1995–2020 || 16 Dec 2020 || 36 || align=left | Disc.: SpacewatchAdded on 9 March 2021 || 
|- id="1995 VO6" bgcolor=#E9E9E9
| 0 ||  || MBA-M || 17.3 || data-sort-value="0.34" | 1.5 km || multiple || 1995-2020 || 26 Mar 2020 || 78 || align=left | Disc.: Spacewatch Alt.: 2009 VL84 = 2010 DN62 = 2018 VL12 || 
|- id="1995 VP6" bgcolor=#d6d6d6
| 0 ||  || MBA-O || 16.95 || 2.3 km || multiple || 1995–2021 || 09 Dec 2021 || 123 || align=left | Disc.: SpacewatchAdded on 24 August 2020 || 
|- id="1995 VR6" bgcolor=#E9E9E9
| 0 ||  || MBA-M || 18.05 || 1.4 km || multiple || 1995–2021 || 12 May 2021 || 42 || align=left | Disc.: SpacewatchAdded on 22 July 2020 || 
|- id="1995 VU6" bgcolor=#fefefe
| 0 ||  || MBA-I || 18.4 || data-sort-value="0.62" | 620 m || multiple || 1995–2020 || 11 Dec 2020 || 85 || align=left | Disc.: SpacewatchAdded on 11 May 2021Alt.: 2013 YH108 || 
|- id="1995 VA7" bgcolor=#d6d6d6
| 0 ||  || MBA-O || 16.76 || 2.5 km || multiple || 1995–2021 || 10 May 2021 || 54 || align=left | Disc.: Spacewatch || 
|- id="1995 VB7" bgcolor=#E9E9E9
| 0 ||  || MBA-M || 17.62 || data-sort-value="0.89" | 890 m || multiple || 1995–2020 || 16 Dec 2020 || 71 || align=left | Disc.: SpacewatchAdded on 11 May 2021Alt.: 2003 SO298, 2011 OV31, 2013 AN34 || 
|- id="1995 VE7" bgcolor=#E9E9E9
| 0 ||  || MBA-M || 17.77 || 1.2 km || multiple || 1995–2021 || 05 Oct 2021 || 54 || align=left | Disc.: SpacewatchAdded on 17 January 2021 || 
|- id="1995 VM7" bgcolor=#d6d6d6
| 0 ||  || MBA-O || 17.79 || 1.5 km || multiple || 1995–2021 || 13 Jul 2021 || 34 || align=left | Disc.: SpacewatchAlt.: 2011 SL143 || 
|- id="1995 VT7" bgcolor=#E9E9E9
| 2 ||  || MBA-M || 18.22 || data-sort-value="0.67" | 700 m || multiple || 1995-2022 || 29 Oct 2022 || 42 || align=left | Disc.: Spacewatch Alt.: 2022 SN164 || 
|- id="1995 VZ7" bgcolor=#d6d6d6
| 4 ||  || HIL || 16.8 || 2.4 km || multiple || 1995–2018 || 06 Oct 2018 || 30 || align=left | Disc.: SpacewatchAdded on 22 July 2020Alt.: 2010 RD7 || 
|- id="1995 VQ14" bgcolor=#d6d6d6
| 0 ||  || MBA-O || 16.85 || 2.4 km || multiple || 1995–2021 || 30 Nov 2021 || 111 || align=left | Disc.: Spacewatch || 
|- id="1995 VY15" bgcolor=#FA8072
| 1 ||  || MCA || 19.2 || data-sort-value="0.43" | 430 m || multiple || 1995–2020 || 14 Nov 2020 || 57 || align=left | Disc.: SpacewatchAdded on 17 January 2021Alt.: 2020 PF28 || 
|- id="1995 VM17" bgcolor=#E9E9E9
| 0 ||  || MBA-M || 17.96 || 1.1 km || multiple || 1995–2021 || 06 Nov 2021 || 64 || align=left | Disc.: SpacewatchAdded on 22 July 2020 || 
|- id="1995 VM19" bgcolor=#E9E9E9
| 0 ||  || MBA-M || 17.27 || 1.5 km || multiple || 1995–2021 || 09 Dec 2021 || 175 || align=left | Disc.: Spacewatch || 
|}
back to top

W 

|- id="1995 WK3" bgcolor=#E9E9E9
| 1 ||  || MBA-M || 19.5 || data-sort-value="0.37" | 370 m || multiple || 1995–2020 || 17 Oct 2020 || 34 || align=left | Disc.: SpacewatchAdded on 17 January 2021 || 
|- id="1995 WL3" bgcolor=#d6d6d6
| 2 ||  || MBA-O || 18.7 || 1.0 km || multiple || 1995–2015 || 14 Jan 2015 || 77 || align=left | Disc.: Spacewatch || 
|- id="1995 WF4" bgcolor=#FA8072
| 0 ||  || MCA || 20.35 || data-sort-value="0.25" | 250 m || multiple || 1995–2019 || 08 May 2019 || 106 || align=left | Disc.: Spacewatch || 
|- id="1995 WO6" bgcolor=#E9E9E9
| 2 ||  || MBA-M || 18.5 || data-sort-value="0.59" | 590 m || multiple || 1995–2020 || 14 Dec 2020 || 44 || align=left | Disc.: Spacewatch || 
|- id="1995 WH9" bgcolor=#E9E9E9
| 0 ||  || MBA-M || 17.8 || data-sort-value="0.82" | 820 m || multiple || 1995–2020 || 22 Nov 2020 || 33 || align=left | Disc.: SpacewatchAdded on 11 May 2021Alt.: 2019 JR58 || 
|- id="1995 WS9" bgcolor=#d6d6d6
| 0 ||  || MBA-O || 17.1 || 2.1 km || multiple || 1995–2019 || 14 Jan 2019 || 25 || align=left | Disc.: SpacewatchAdded on 22 July 2020Alt.: 2017 QG91 || 
|- id="1995 WB10" bgcolor=#d6d6d6
| 0 ||  || MBA-O || 17.85 || 1.5 km || multiple || 1995–2021 || 30 Nov 2021 || 69 || align=left | Disc.: SpacewatchAdded on 24 December 2021 || 
|- id="1995 WH11" bgcolor=#E9E9E9
| 1 ||  || MBA-M || 17.3 || 1.9 km || multiple || 1995–2021 || 12 Jun 2021 || 37 || align=left | Disc.: SpacewatchAdded on 30 September 2021Alt.: 2021 JY10 || 
|- id="1995 WE12" bgcolor=#E9E9E9
| 1 ||  || MBA-M || 17.5 || data-sort-value="0.94" | 940 m || multiple || 1995–2021 || 17 Jan 2021 || 66 || align=left | Disc.: SpacewatchAlt.: 2015 OX49 || 
|- id="1995 WH13" bgcolor=#d6d6d6
| 0 ||  || MBA-O || 16.77 || 2.5 km || multiple || 1995–2021 || 09 Nov 2021 || 144 || align=left | Disc.: Spacewatch || 
|- id="1995 WA15" bgcolor=#fefefe
| 0 ||  || MBA-I || 18.22 || data-sort-value="0.67" | 670 m || multiple || 1995–2021 || 08 Sep 2021 || 65 || align=left | Disc.: Spacewatch || 
|- id="1995 WC15" bgcolor=#E9E9E9
| 0 ||  || MBA-M || 17.0 || 1.2 km || multiple || 1995–2020 || 17 Dec 2020 || 110 || align=left | Disc.: SpacewatchAdded on 17 January 2021Alt.: 2018 FW37 || 
|- id="1995 WU15" bgcolor=#fefefe
| 1 ||  || MBA-I || 18.5 || data-sort-value="0.59" | 590 m || multiple || 1995–2021 || 17 Jan 2021 || 39 || align=left | Disc.: SpacewatchAdded on 11 May 2021Alt.: 2013 YH136 || 
|- id="1995 WE18" bgcolor=#E9E9E9
| 0 ||  || MBA-M || 18.0 || data-sort-value="0.75" | 750 m || multiple || 1995–2020 || 08 Dec 2020 || 55 || align=left | Disc.: SpacewatchAdded on 11 May 2021Alt.: 2019 JS80 || 
|- id="1995 WP18" bgcolor=#E9E9E9
| 0 ||  || MBA-M || 17.95 || 1.1 km || multiple || 1995–2021 || 31 Oct 2021 || 47 || align=left | Disc.: SpacewatchAdded on 30 September 2021 || 
|- id="1995 WG19" bgcolor=#E9E9E9
| 0 ||  || MBA-M || 17.72 || 1.2 km || multiple || 1995–2021 || 24 Oct 2021 || 75 || align=left | Disc.: SpacewatchAdded on 22 July 2020 || 
|- id="1995 WP19" bgcolor=#E9E9E9
| 0 ||  || MBA-M || 18.4 || data-sort-value="0.62" | 620 m || multiple || 1995–2021 || 09 Jan 2021 || 33 || align=left | Disc.: SpacewatchAdded on 11 May 2021 || 
|- id="1995 WD20" bgcolor=#fefefe
| 1 ||  || MBA-I || 18.8 || data-sort-value="0.52" | 520 m || multiple || 1995–2018 || 04 Dec 2018 || 41 || align=left | Disc.: Spacewatch || 
|- id="1995 WH24" bgcolor=#E9E9E9
| 0 ||  = (619156) || MBA-M || 17.0 || 2.2 km || multiple || 1995–2022 || 01 Nov 2022 || 101 || align=left | Disc.: Spacewatch || 
|- id="1995 WK25" bgcolor=#E9E9E9
| 0 ||  || MBA-M || 17.81 || 1.2 km || multiple || 1995–2021 || 08 Sep 2021 || 55 || align=left | Disc.: Spacewatch || 
|- id="1995 WG28" bgcolor=#E9E9E9
| 0 ||  || MBA-M || 17.4 || data-sort-value="0.98" | 980 m || multiple || 1995–2020 || 20 Dec 2020 || 112 || align=left | Disc.: Spacewatch || 
|- id="1995 WR28" bgcolor=#E9E9E9
| 2 ||  || MBA-M || 18.3 || data-sort-value="0.65" | 650 m || multiple || 1995–2021 || 16 Jan 2021 || 50 || align=left | Disc.: SpacewatchAdded on 11 May 2021Alt.: 2020 UF24 || 
|- id="1995 WO29" bgcolor=#d6d6d6
| 0 ||  || MBA-O || 17.27 || 2.0 km || multiple || 1995–2021 || 07 Nov 2021 || 65 || align=left | Disc.: SpacewatchAdded on 24 August 2020 || 
|- id="1995 WB34" bgcolor=#fefefe
| 2 ||  || MBA-I || 18.4 || data-sort-value="0.62" | 620 m || multiple || 1995–2016 || 06 Dec 2016 || 49 || align=left | Disc.: Spacewatch || 
|- id="1995 WL34" bgcolor=#fefefe
| 0 ||  || MBA-I || 18.9 || data-sort-value="0.49" | 490 m || multiple || 1995–2020 || 23 Aug 2020 || 65 || align=left | Disc.: SpacewatchAdded on 19 October 2020 || 
|- id="1995 WO37" bgcolor=#d6d6d6
| – ||  || MBA-O || 17.1 || 2.1 km || single || 36 days || 28 Dec 1995 || 10 || align=left | Disc.: Spacewatch || 
|- id="1995 WP44" bgcolor=#d6d6d6
| 0 ||  || MBA-O || 16.29 || 3.1 km || multiple || 1995–2022 || 21 Jan 2022 || 161 || align=left | Disc.: Spacewatch || 
|- id="1995 WR44" bgcolor=#d6d6d6
| 0 ||  || MBA-O || 16.34 || 3.0 km || multiple || 1995–2021 || 17 Jul 2021 || 121 || align=left | Disc.: Spacewatch || 
|- id="1995 WS44" bgcolor=#fefefe
| 0 ||  || MBA-I || 18.10 || data-sort-value="0.71" | 710 m || multiple || 1995–2021 || 08 May 2021 || 128 || align=left | Disc.: Spacewatch || 
|- id="1995 WT44" bgcolor=#E9E9E9
| 0 ||  || MBA-M || 17.29 || 1.9 km || multiple || 1995–2021 || 11 Sep 2021 || 154 || align=left | Disc.: Spacewatch || 
|- id="1995 WU44" bgcolor=#d6d6d6
| 0 ||  || MBA-O || 16.63 || 2.6 km || multiple || 1995–2021 || 04 Aug 2021 || 95 || align=left | Disc.: Spacewatch || 
|}
back to top

X 

|- id="1995 XL4" bgcolor=#E9E9E9
| 0 ||  || MBA-M || 17.41 || 1.4 km || multiple || 1995–2021 || 02 Dec 2021 || 104 || align=left | Disc.: Spacewatch || 
|}
back to top

Y 

|- id="1995 YT1" bgcolor=#FA8072
| 0 ||  || MCA || 20.82 || data-sort-value="0.20" | 200 m || multiple || 1995–2022 || 06 Jan 2022 || 83 || align=left | Disc.: Spacewatch || 
|- id="1995 YY3" bgcolor=#C2E0FF
| E ||  || TNO || 8.5 || 83 km || multiple || 1995–1996 || 13 Sep 1996 || 21 || align=left | Disc.: Mauna Kea Obs.LoUTNOs, other TNO || 
|- id="1995 YT5" bgcolor=#fefefe
| 0 ||  || MBA-I || 18.5 || data-sort-value="0.59" | 590 m || multiple || 1995–2020 || 26 Dec 2020 || 53 || align=left | Disc.: SpacewatchAlt.: 2014 AK1 || 
|- id="1995 YV14" bgcolor=#fefefe
| 1 ||  || MBA-I || 18.8 || data-sort-value="0.52" | 520 m || multiple || 1995–2020 || 17 Nov 2020 || 45 || align=left | Disc.: SpacewatchAdded on 17 June 2021Alt.: 2006 YF68 || 
|}
back to top

References 
 

Lists of unnumbered minor planets